= White Sulphur Springs order of battle =

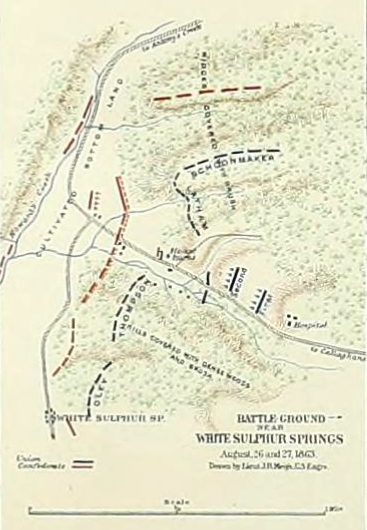
Averell was repelled by Patton

The following army units were involved in the Battle of White Sulphur Springs on August 26 and 27, 1863, in the American Civil War. Although the battle took place near White Sulphur Springs, West Virginia, it has also been called the Battle of Rocky Gap, the Battle of Dry Creek, the Battle of Howard's Creek, and the Battle of the Lawbooks. A Confederate Army force led by Colonel George S. Patton Sr. successfully repelled a Union Army brigade led by Brigadier General William W. Averell.

The Union Army units, and their commanders, are listed first. The Confederate Army units, and their commanders, follow. Most of the men on both sides were from West Virginia and Virginia units, and some of the Confederates were from Greenbrier County, where the battle took place.

== Abbreviations used ==
=== Military rank ===
- BG = Brigadier General
- Col = Colonel
- Ltc = Lieutenant Colonel
- Maj = Major
- Cpt = Captain
- Lt = 1st Lieutenant

=== Other ===
- w = wounded
- k = killed

== Middle Military District, VIII Corps ==
=== Fourth Separate Brigade ===
BG William W. Averell (Note: Appendix A of Wittenberg's book is the major source herein. Other sources are footnoted.)

Cpt Paul von Köenig, Aide-de-camp, detached from 68th New York Infantry Regiment (k)
Lt William H. Rumsey, Aide-de-camp
Lt John R. Meigs, Engineer Officer

Group	Regiments and Others
Mounted Infantry	2nd West Virginia Mounted Infantry Regiment (9 companies): Col George R. Latham; 3rd West Virginia Mounted Infantry Regiment: Ltc Francis W. Thompson; 8th West Virginia Mounted Infantry Regiment: Col John H. Oley
Cavalry	14th Pennsylvania Cavalry Regiment: Col James M. Schoonmaker; Gibson's Independent Cavalry Battalion: Maj Thomas Gibson (14th Pennsylvania Cavalry); 3rd West Virginia Cavalry Regiment, (Co. E, H, I); 1st West Virginia Cavalry Regiment, (Co. A); 16th Illinois Cavalry Regiment, (Co. C); 3rd Independent Company Ohio Cavalry; Additional Information: Company A of the 1st West Virginia Cavalry was also known as the Kelley Lancers.; Company C of 16th Illinois Cavalry was also known as the Chicago Dragoons.
Artillery	Battery G, 1st West Virginia Light Artillery Regiment: Cpt Chatham T. Ewing (w), Lt Howard Morton; Additional Information: Battery G was also known as "Ewing's Battery".

Approximately 1,300 men in brigade at the battle.

== Other Union forces not at White Sulphur Springs ==
This portion of Averell's 4th Separate Brigade remained near Huntersville after the town was captured by Averell.

Group	Regiments and Others
Infantry	10th West Virginia Infantry Regiment: Col Thomas M. Harris
Artillery	Battery B, 1st West Virginia Light Artillery Regiment: Cpt John V. Keeper; Additional Information: Battery B was also known as "Keeper's Battery".; Averell lists Battery B (Keeper's Battery) as having four casualties during his excursion.

== Union images ==
Principal Union commanders
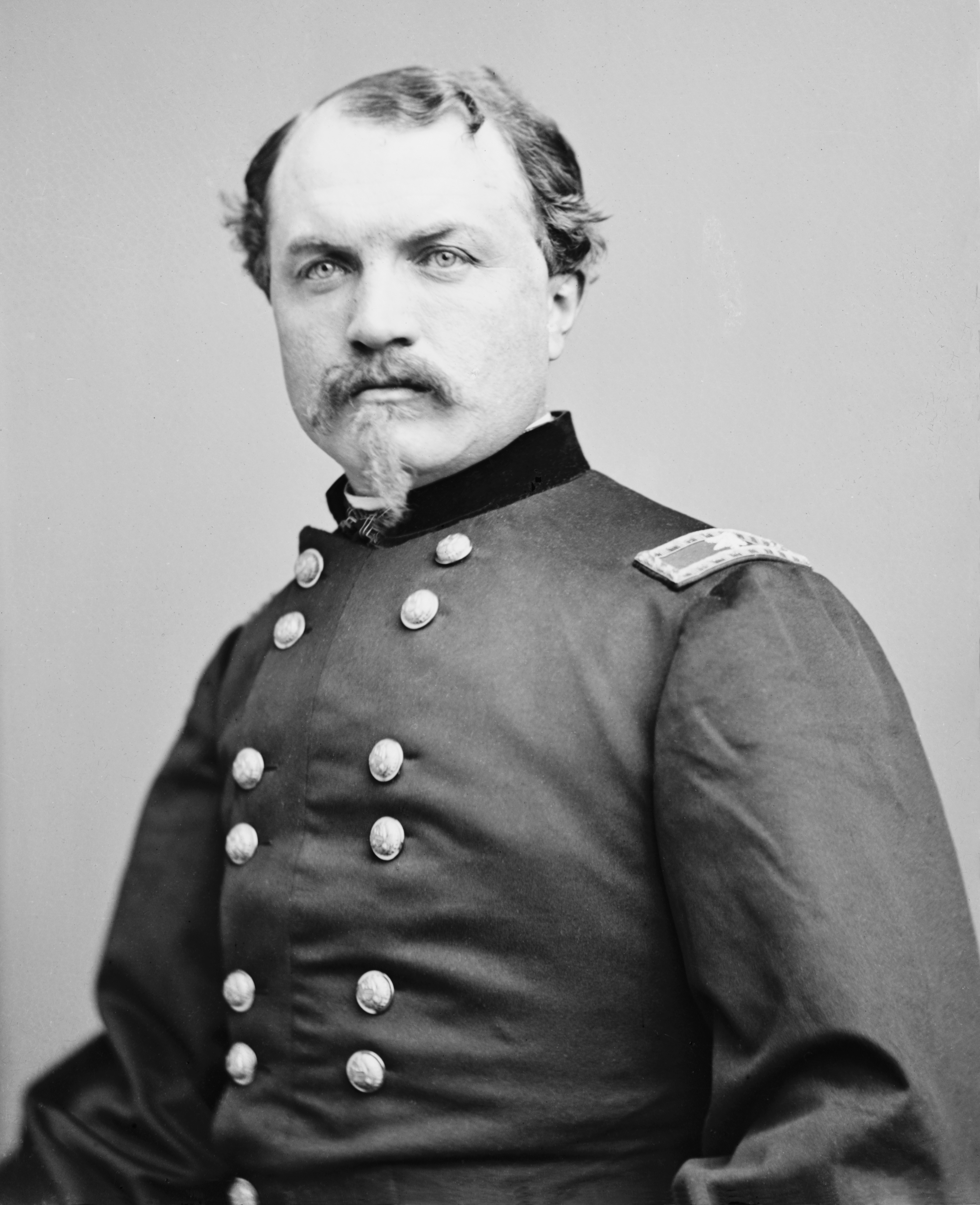
BG William W. Averell
Brigade Commander

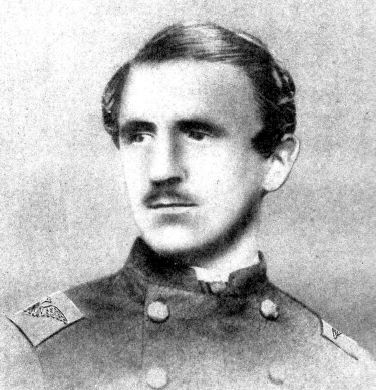
Col James M. Schoonmaker
14 PA Cav.

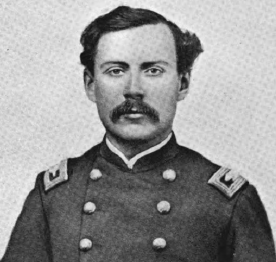
Col John H. Oley
8th WV Mt. Inf.

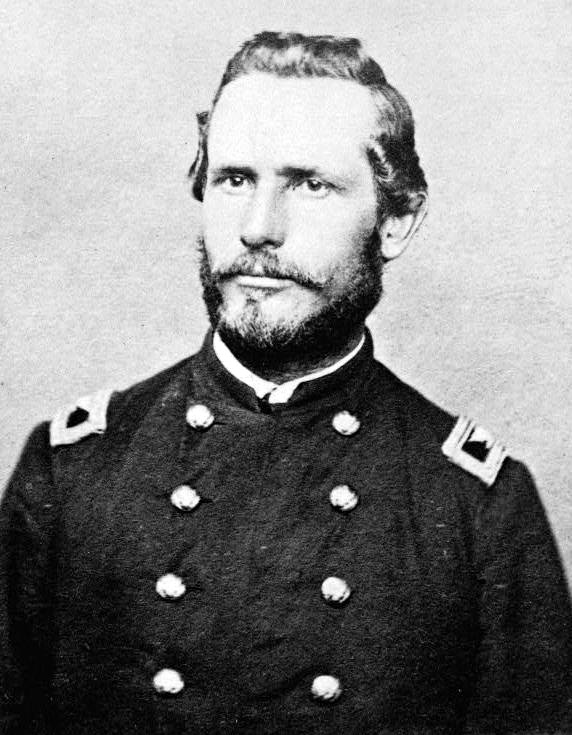
Col George R. Latham
2nd WV Mt. Inf.

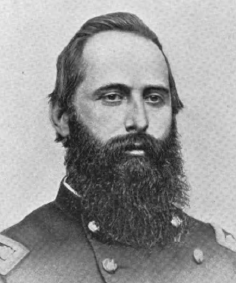
Ltc Francis W. Thompson
3rd WV Mt. Inf.

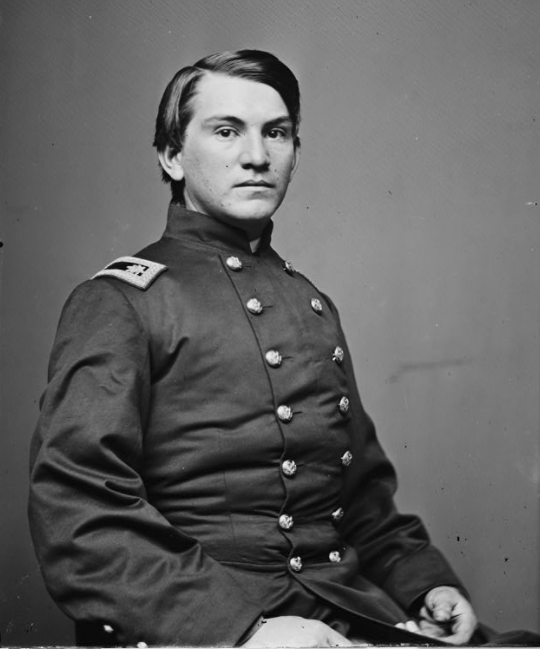
Maj Thomas Gibson
Gibson's Cav. Bat.

== Confederate Department of Western Virginia ==
Col George S. Patton Sr., acting commander in absence of BG John Echols

Maj W. B. Myers, assistant adjutant-general
Cpt R. L. Poor, engineer corps
Lt Noyes Rand, acting assistant adjutant-general
Lt E. C. Gordon, ordnance officer
Lt James F. Patton, acting brigade inspector
Lt Henry C. Caldwell, volunteer aide

Echols' 1st Brigade	Regiments and Others
Col George S. Patton Sr. (22nd Virginia Infantry)	22nd Virginia Infantry Regiment: Ltc Andrew R. Barbee (w) Maj R. Augustus "Gus" Bailey; 23rd Virginia Infantry Battalion: Ltc Clarence Derrick; 26th Virginia Infantry Battalion: Ltc George M. Edgar; 45th Virginia Infantry Regiment: Col William H. Browne; Virginia Light Artillery, Chapman's Company: Cpt George Beirne Chapman; Additional Information: The 22nd Virginia Infantry was originally known as the 1st Kanawha Regiment, which evolved from the Kanawha Riflemen.; The 22nd Virginia Infantry's Company K was detached to the Narrows of New River, leaving about 500 men in the regiment at the battle.; About half of the 22nd Virginia Infantry fought on the extreme left with Derrick's Battalion.; The 23rd Virginia Infantry Battalion was also known as the 1st Battalion and as Derrick's Battalion.; The 26th Virginia Infantry Battalion was also known as Edgar's Battalion.; Company I from the 26th Virginia Infantry Battalion was detached for guard duty at Dublin, Virginia, and did not participate in the battle.; Over 100 men from the 45th Virginia Infantry were under the command of Ltc Edwin H. Harman on a hill at the extreme Confederate right.; Major William McLaughlin was present for the battle and commanded artillery.; Chapman's battery consisted of two 3-inch rifled guns, one 12-pounder howitzer, and one 24-pounder howitzer.; This force, including a detachment of the 37th Virginia Cavalry Battalion, totaled to about 1,900 men.

Additional forces	Regiments and Others
Col James M. Corns (8th Virginia Cavalry)	8th Virginia Cavalry Regiment: Col James M. Corns; Maj Thomas P. Bowen (3 co. on battlefield): 37th Virginia Cavalry Battalion (200 men): Maj J. R. Claiborne; Additional Information: Corns, with five companies of the 8th Virginia Cavalry plus a portion of the 37th Virginia Cavalry, pursued Averell before the battle. He arrived at the battlefield on the evening of August 26, and most of his force was held in reserve. On the next day, he pursued Averell when Averell began his retreat.; The 37th Virginia Cavalry Battalion was also known as Dunn's Battalion.

Approximately 2,300 men at the battle.

== Additional Confederate forces not in the battle ==
Jackson's Brigade was not directly involved in the Battle of White Sulphur Springs. The brigade was involved in the pursuit of Averell when Averell was moving south. A week prior to the Battle of White Sulphur Springs, Averell captured Jackson's Camp Northwest near Huntersville, West Virginia, and Jackson fled the area. Averell destroyed the camp's commissary, blacksmith shops, and equipment, while keeping items such as canteens, stretchers, and hospital supplies. After the Battle of White Sulphur Springs, Jackson's pursuit of Averell was described as "halfhearted and not well managed".

	Regiments and Others
Col William L. "Mudwall" Jackson; 19th Virginia Cavalry; Jackson's Brigade	19th Virginia Cavalry Regiment: Ltc William P. Thompson; Lt George W. Siple (commanded detachment): 20th Virginia Cavalry Regiment: Col William Wiley Arnett; Ltc Dudley Evans (commanded detachment) Cpt Elihu Hutton (commanded detachment): Kessler's Battalion: Maj Joseph R. Kessler (19th Virginia Cavalry); Four independent cavalry companies; Additional Information: Kessler's Battalion, with the addition of two more companies, became the 46th Battalion Virginia Cavalry in early 1864.; Unidentified forces from BG John D. Imboden' brigade skirmished with Averell's brigade while moving toward White Sulphur Springs, and mounted infantry from Imboden's Brigade was involved in the pursuit after the battle.; Unidentified forces from Col Milton J. Ferguson's cavalry brigade were involved in the pursuit but did not engage.

== Confederate images ==
Principal Confederate commanders
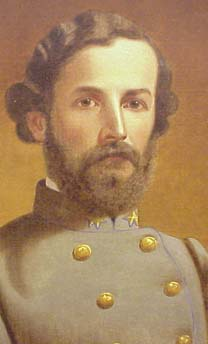
Col George S. Patton
Brigade Commander

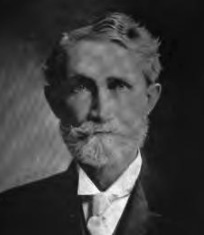
Ltc George M. Edgar
26 VA Inf Bat

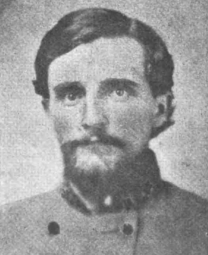
Ltc Edwin H. Harman
45 VA Inf Regiment

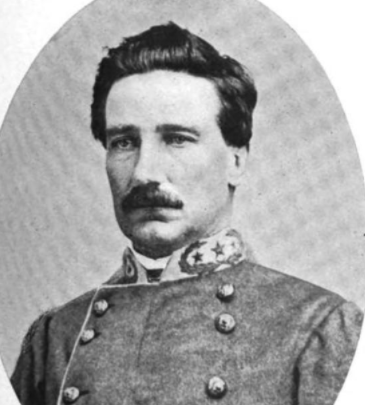
BG John D. Imboden
Commander, Valley District

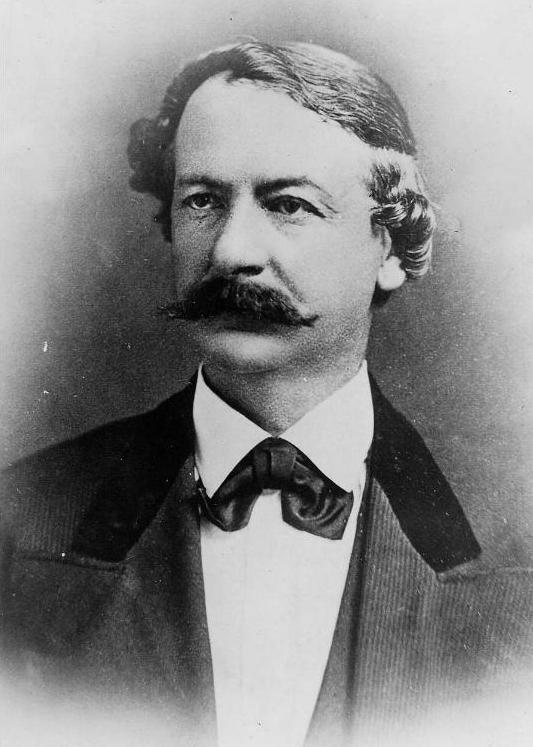
Col William L. Jackson
Brigade Commander

== Notes ==
=== References ===
- Lowry, Terry (1996). Last Sleep: The Battle of Droop Mountain, November 6, 1863. Charleston, West Virginia: Pictorial Histories Publishing Company. ISBN 978-1-57510-024-1. OCLC 36488613.
- Reader, Frank S. (1890). History of the Fifth West Virginia Cavalry, Formerly the Second Virginia Infantry, and of Battery G, First West Virginia Light Artillery. New Brighton, Pennsylvania: Daily News, Frank S. Reader, Editor and Proprietor.
- Scott, Robert N., ed. (1890). The War of the Rebellion: a Compilation of the Official Records of the Union and Confederate Armies Series I Volume XXIX Part I. Washington, DC: Government Printing Office. OCLC 318422190.
- Wittenberg, Eric J. (2011). The Battle of White Sulphur Springs: Averell Fails to Secure West Virginia. Charleston, South Carolina: History Press. ISBN 978-1-61423-326-8. OCLC 795566215.
