= 23rd Virginia Infantry Battalion =

United States Civil War military unit

23rd Battalion, Virginia Infantry
- Flag of Virginia, 1861
- Active: January 1862 – Spring 1865
- Country: Confederate States of America
- Allegiance: Virginia
- Branch: Confederate States Army
- Role: Infantry
- Nickname: Derrick's Battalion
- Engagements: American Civil War 1862: Fayetteville (Virginia), Charleston (Virginia); 1863: White Sulphur Springs, Droop Mountain 1864: New Market, North Anna, Cold Harbor, Lynchburg, Cool Spring, Second Battle of Kernstown, Third Winchester, Fisher's Hill, Cedar Creek

Commanders
- Major: David Stuart Hounshell 1862
- Lt. Colonel: Clarence Derrick 1862–1864
- Major: William Blessing 1864–1865

The 23rd Virginia Infantry Battalion, often called "Derrick's Battalion", was an infantry battalion in the Confederate Army during the American Civil War. It fought mostly in western Virginia (now West Virginia) and the Shenandoah Valley, and was usually part of a brigade commanded by John Echols or George S. Patton. By 1864, the brigade was usually part of a division commanded by Major General John C. Breckinridge or Brigadier General Gabriel C. Wharton.

From its organization in January 1862 until a reorganization in May of the same year, the battalion was commanded by Major David Stuart Hounshell. Shortly after the reorganization, Lieutenant Colonel Clarence Derrick was commissioned and became battalion commander. Derrick graduated from the United States Military Academy (West Point) in 1861. Most of the battalion's men were from Virginia counties located along the Appalachian Mountains. An additional company was from West Virginia's Mercer County, and another company from North Carolina's Stokes County.

Battles at White Sulphur Springs, Droop Mountain, and Third Winchester were the most significant fighting for the battalion. Major William Blessing temporarily led the battalion in the Battle of Droop Mountain in 1863. After Derrick was captured in the Third Battle of Winchester on September 19, 1864, Captain Edmund S. Read temporarily commanded the battalion until Blessing returned from the hospital. Blessing commanded the battalion until the end of the war.

== Formation and organization ==
The 23rd Virginia Infantry Battalion, also known as Derrick's Battalion or the 1st Battalion, was organized on January 15, 1862. It originally consisted of five companies commanded by Major David Stuart Hounshell. Several of the companies were originally part of an unsuccessful attempt to organize a regiment. The battalion was reorganized on May 21 of the same year. Clarence Derrick was commissioned lieutenant colonel and assigned command of the battalion on May 25. (Note: A second source, Lowry, says Derrick "was assigned command of the 23rd Battalion Virginia Infantry April 2, 1862".) Derrick, who graduated from the United States Military Academy (a.k.a. West Point) in 1861, was previously adjutant to Brigadier General John B. Floyd.

Three more companies were added in the spring of 1863, completing the battalion at eight companies. Most of the men in the battalion were from the Virginia counties of Smyth, Tazewell, and Giles. One company was from Mercer County, which was located in western Virginia and became part of the new state of West Virginia. Another company was from Stokes County, North Carolina, which is located along the border with Virginia. Captains William P. Cecil and William Blessing became majors of the battalion. Cecil resigned in the spring of 1862. Blessing received his promotion on March 5, 1863. After Derrick was captured on September 19, 1864, Blessing commanded the battalion for the remaining portion of the war.

== Early service ==
=== Kanawha campaign of 1862 ===
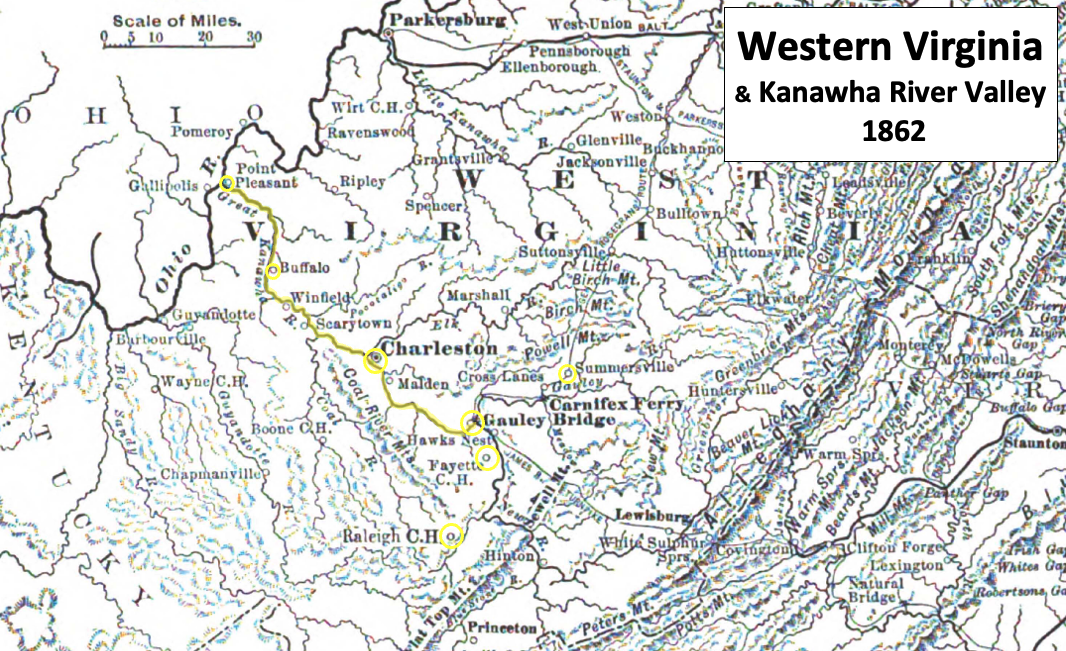
The Kanawha River Valley was important to the Confederacy

Lieutenant Colonel Clarence Derrick commanded the 23rd Virginia Infantry Battalion. His battalion was also known as Derrick's Battalion or the 1st Battalion. Its first action as a unit came in the Kanawha Valley Campaign of 1862. At that time, the battalion was part of the Army of Southwestern Virginia, which was commanded by Major General William W. Loring. The battalion was in the First Brigade, which was commanded by Brigadier General John Echols. (Note: Echols' health problems often prevented him from commanding in the field, although he was considered a good organizer. When he was unable to go into the field, he usually had George W. Patton take his place as brigade commander.)

On September 6, Loring began a campaign to remove Union soldiers from the Kanawha Valley. His army moved north to Fayetteville, Virginia, where he attacked a Union brigade on September 10 in the Battle of Fayetteville. Fayetteville was often called "Fayette Court House", and later became part of West Virginia. In this battle, Derrick's Battalion was detached to a flanking force that moved behind the Union fortifications at Fayetteville. The Union force escaped during the night, and Loring's army pursued it to Charleston.

In September 13, the battalion fought the two-brigade Union army commanded by Colonel Joseph Andrew Jackson Lightburn in the Battle of Charleston. In this battle, the battalion was part of the First Brigade, which was temporarily commanded by Colonel John McCausland since Echols was ill. The battalion formed a skirmish line that led the attack on Union forces within the city. The Union army burned a bridge across the Elk River, and escaped to the safety of Ohio. During the entire campaign, the battalion had a total of 29 casualties—including two killed.

=== White Sulphur Springs ===
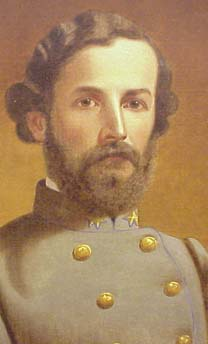
George Patton

During August 26 and 27, 1863, Derrick's Battalion fought in the Battle of White Sulphur Springs, which is also known as the Battle of Dry Creek. (Note: Although modern historians call the action the Battle of White Sulphur Springs, other names have been used. Union veterans tended to call it the Battle of Rocky Gap, while Confederate veterans called it the Battle of Dry Creek. Others have called it the Battle of Howard's Creek or the Battle of the Law Books.) The battle took place at the intersection of Anthony's Creek Road and the James River and Kanawha Turnpike, which was about one mile (1.6 km) east of the town of White Sulphur Springs. Further west was Lewisburg, the Greenbrier County seat. Derrick's Battalion was part of a brigade normally commanded by John Echols, but temporarily commanded by Colonel George S. Patton. The brigade was part of the Department of East Tennessee, which was commanded by Major General Samuel Jones. Jones called his command the "Department of Western Virginia", and he was headquartered in Sweet Springs, West Virginia. Jones monitored a Union expedition toward Lewisburg that was led by Brigadier General William W. Averell. Jones was concerned for the safety of the Virginia and Tennessee Railroad, which was used to transport soldiers and supplies for the Confederate army.

Averell's Union brigade consisted of cavalry and mounted infantry, and totaled to about 1,300 men. The Confederate brigade led by Patton consisted of about 2,300 men. Derrick's Battalion, with additional men from the 37th Virginia Infantry Battalion, arrived at the battle after it began. Patton had become concerned about his left, and Derrick's Battalion arrived in time to reinforce that section of the battlefield. While Derrick made position adjustments, Major William Blessing led two companies of the battalion to the line of battle. Blessing's detachment helped repel a charge made by the 2nd West Virginia Mounted Infantry. The Confederate army successfully stopped Averell near White Sulphur Springs, and Averell was pursued back to a Union outpost in Beverly, West Virginia. Casualties for the 23rd Virginia Infantry Battalion were three killed and 18 wounded for a total of 21 of the 162 reported casualties for Patton's brigade.

=== Droop Mountain ===
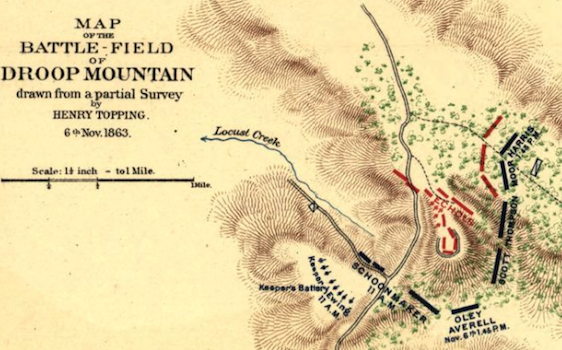
Facing south, Union troops used a three-sided attack

The Battle of Droop Mountain occurred in Pocahontas County, West Virginia, on November 6, 1863. In this battle, a Union brigade commanded by Averell defeated a smaller force commanded by Echols. Averell's objective was to move south past Droop Mountain to Lewisburg, West Virginia, where he would join another Union brigade moving from Charleston to Lewisburg, to drive out a Confederate force stationed there. The second part of his objective, which was the principal goal, was to advance further south and destroy a railroad bridge over the New River—which would make it difficult for two Confederate divisions commanded by Lieutenant General James Longstreet to return to Virginia from Tennessee. To protect Lewisburg and the railroad, Echols arrived at Droop Mountain with Patton as his brigade leader. He reinforced a smaller unit already at the top of the mountain. The smaller force was commanded by Colonel William L. "Mudwall" Jackson. As part of Patton's brigade, Derrick's Battalion was temporarily commanded by Major William Blessing. Echols placed Derrick's Battalion on his extreme right, putting the men on the right side of the road to Lewisburg at the summit of the mountain.

Averell placed artillery and one cavalry regiment on his left, and three mounted infantry regiments occupied the center. They needed to get past the mountain to continue toward Lewisburg. Averell planned an attack where a portion of his troops would divert the attention of the Confederates with artillery from the front and left, while a 1,175-man force would covertly flank Echols from the Union right (Confederate left). To counter the flanking maneuver (and pleas for help), Derrick's Battalion (except one company) was shifted to the Confederate left. The Union plan worked well, and eventually Confederate troops fled in panic. Derrick's Battalion had 5 killed, 26 wounded, and 29 captured for a total of 60 casualties. For all Confederate troops, 33 were killed, 121 wounded, and 122 captured for a total of 276 casualties. Echols' men escaped south before the Union brigade from Charleston arrived at Lewisburg, and Averell did not continue south to the railroad because of rumors that heavy Confederate reinforcements were arriving at the New River bridge. Although some historians conclude that Confederate resistance in West Virginia collapsed after this battle, the fighting may have simply shifted to the Shenandoah Valley.

== Service 1864 ==
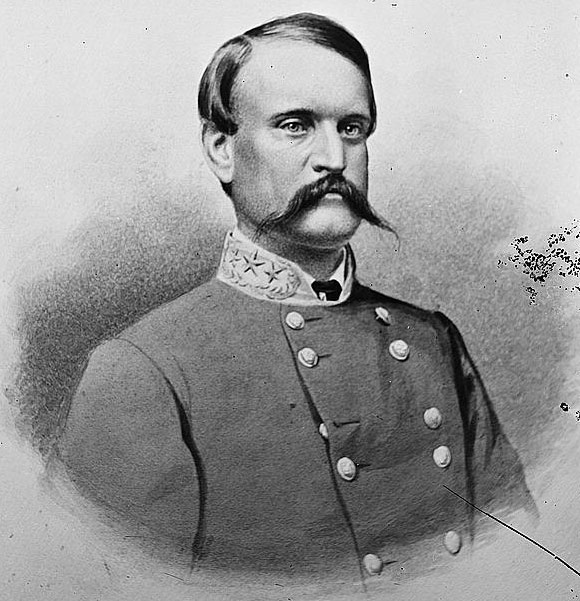
John C. Breckinridge

At the beginning of 1864, Echols' Brigade (with Patton listed as commander) continued to be part of the Confederate Department of Western Virginia. The brigade operated as a detached unit in West Virginia, including near the community of Beverly. In March, Major General John C. Breckinridge was assigned command of the department. The territory included Virginia west of the Blue Ridge Mountains and south of Stanton, Virginia, and the southern portion of the new Union state of West Virginia. By that time he had only 5,000 scattered troops to defend nearly 18,000 square miles (47,000 km^{2}) of mountainous terrain.

Breckinridge became concerned about the increasing number of Union troops near his territory, so he began concentrating Confederate troops during early May. Among the troops concentrated near Staunton, Virginia, were Echols' brigade and a second brigade commanded by Brigadier General Gabriel C. Wharton. Derrick's Battalion, along with the 26th Virginia Infantry Battalion and 22nd Virginia Infantry Regiment, comprised Echols' brigade. The 2,150-man brigade was well armed and equipped as of May 6, and described as "soldierly and imposing". Working as a division commanded by Breckinridge, the two brigades moved north to Harrisonburg on May 13. Further north in the valley was a Union army commanded by Major General Franz Sigel.

=== New Market and east ===
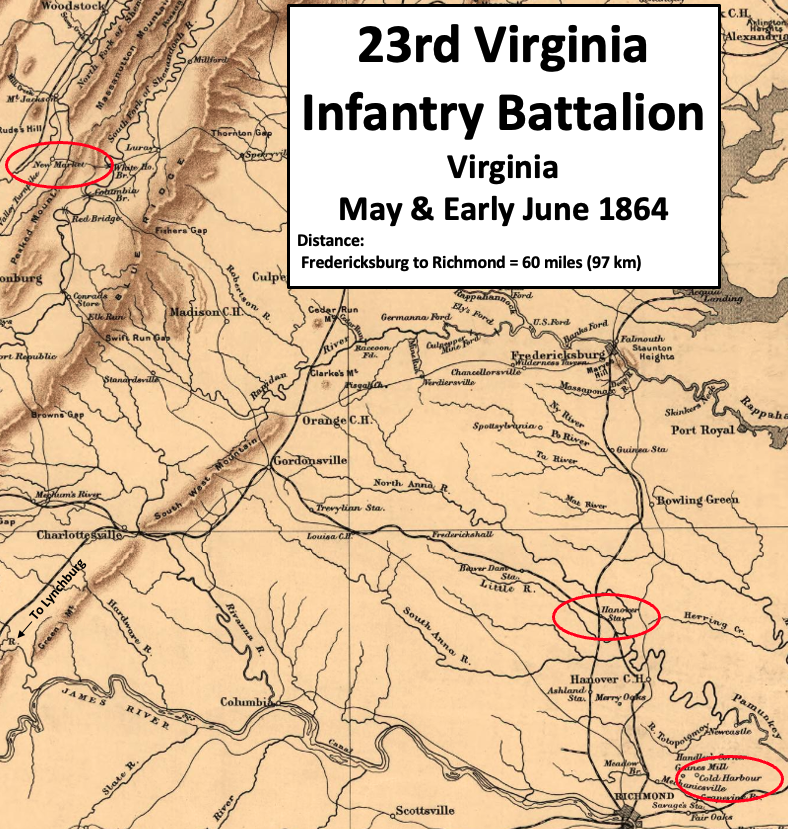
Echol's Brigade moved from New Market to Hanover Junction

Breckinridge's Division, with cavalry, fought Sigel in the Battle of New Market on May 15. Derrick's Battalion began the fight near the Valley Pike concealed from Union troops. Derrick was the only Confederate West Point graduate in the battle. Included among the Confederate troops were cadets from the Virginia Military Institute (a.k.a. VMI). Defending from high ground and then taking the offensive, Breckenridge drove Sigel's larger force away. As part of this fight, Derrick's Battalion helped repel an attacking Union cavalry division commanded by Major General Julius Stahel. The battalion was also involved in a flanking maneuver that inflicted 45 percent casualties on the Union's 54th Pennsylvania Infantry Regiment. Derrick's Battalion, which consisted of 579 men, had two killed, 75 wounded, and two missing for a total of 79 casualties. The Union defeat led to Sigel being replaced by Major General David Hunter.

After the battle, Breckinridge was ordered out of the valley and moved to Hanover Junction near the North Anna River, where he waited for additional Confederate troops. Breckinridge's assignment was to protect the rail junction. The junction was a vital part of the Army of Northern Virginia's supply lines, and Confederate troops arrived there before Union Lieutenant General Ulysses S. Grant's Army of the Potomac. Lee and Grant's armies had multiple skirmishes in the area that became known collectively as the Battle of North Anna, but no significant gains were made by either side.

The battalion's next significant fight was during the end of May and early June, at the Battle of Cold Harbor, where Breckinridge's Division reinforced the Army of Northern Virginia commanded by General Robert E. Lee. Here, Lee defeated Grant's Army of the Potomac. Breckinridge's Division repulsed a Union attack during the battle, but Breckinridge was injured when his horse fell on him after being struck by a cannonball. Casualties for the 23rd Virginia Infantry Battalion were nine killed, 15 wounded, and seven captured, for a total of 31.

=== Lynchburg ===
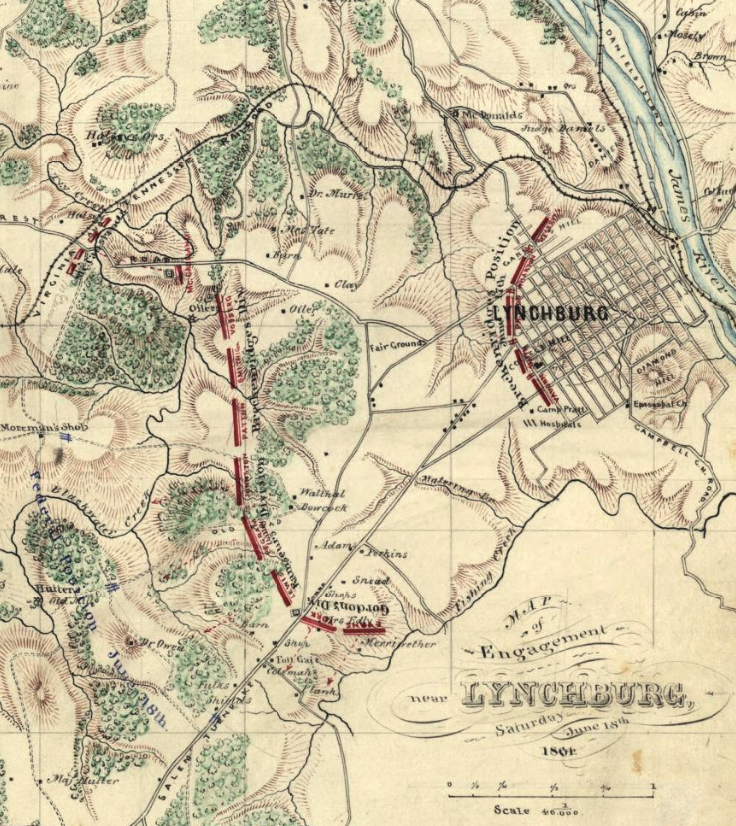
Patton's Brigade was part of the Lynchburg defense

On June 5, Union Major General Hunter defeated Confederate forces led by Brigadier General William E. "Grumble" Jones in the Battle of Piedmont. When news of the defeat reached Confederate General Robert E. Lee, he decided to send Breckinridge, and his division, back to the Shenandoah Valley. Echols' (including Derrick's Battalion) and Wharton's brigades began moving on June 7, beginning by boarding rail cars in Richmond. Five days later, Lee decided to send Lieutenant General Jubal Early's entire 2nd Corps to the Shenandoah to join Breckenridge. Anticipating an attack on Lynchburg, Breckinridge arrived there ahead of his troops on June 15. Arriving later at the Charlottesville rail station, Early received a message that Lynchburg was the probable point of attack for Hunter. Early used a limited supply of railcars to began sending his troops to Lynchburg. He arrived there with a small portion of his troops on June 17.

Breckinridge's original June 17 defensive fortifications were near College Hill on the western edge of the city, and they were designed to protect the city from incursions via the Salem Turnpike (from the southwest) and Forrest Road (from the west). Echols' Brigade (including Derrick's Battalion) was commanded by Patton, and it was placed on the west side of the city just north of the Salem Turnpike. After an inspection, Early moved all troops further west to protect the city from bombardment. He moved the division commanded by Major General Stephen Dodson Ramseur to a fortification nearly two miles (3.2 km) southwest of the city with two pieces of artillery. Patton's men were repositioned adjacent to, and north of, Ramseur's Division. With additional artillery and troops added to Ramseur's force, the Union attack was repulsed. Further north near Forest Road, another Union advance was stopped. The Battle of Lynchburg became an artillery duel by nightfall.

Early resorted to some trickery during the evening of June 17 and early morning of June 18. He countermarched one regiment all night near the train station, and ran a yard locomotive back and forth on the rails. Although more Confederate troops were moving toward Lynchburg, the locomotive illusion gave the Union soldiers the impression that more Confederate troops were arriving immediately. After sunrise, skirmishing began again near Forest Road and the Salem Turnpike. Around 1:00 pm, Early's men began attacking, and they pushed back the Union soldiers until they were surprised by a brigade hidden behind a hill. Although Early's men were driven back to their original fortifications, Hunter was now convinced he was facing a large Confederate army. That evening Hunter's army began a retreat west.

=== Early threatens Washington ===
After the Battle of Lynchburg, Early pursued Hunter's army until June 22. After the pursuit, Early and Breckinridge began moving down the Shenandoah Valley to attack Western Maryland. Lee had urged Early to threaten Washington, which would draw Union forces away from Lee's front near Richmond. For the month of July, the 23rd Virginia Infantry Battalion was part of Patton's (Echols') Brigade, in Breckinridge's Division, in Breckinridge's Corps, in the Army of the Valley District. Breckinridge was corps commander, Wharton was division commander, and Patton was brigade commander.

On July 9, Early's army fought in the Battle of Monocacy near the city of Frederick, Maryland, but Patton's brigade was not engaged. Early's army approached the north side of Washington DC on July 11–12 in the Battle of Fort Stevens, but withdrew and Derrick's Battalion did not engage. Early was pursued as he moved west back toward the Shenandoah Valley. On the morning of July 17, Early and Breckinridge deployed in Clarke County, Virginia. Later in the day, Union pursuers skirmished with Early's troops near Snicker's Ford in what became known as the Battle of Cool Spring. Skirmishers from Patton's Brigade fought on July 18. Union forces withdrew that evening.

=== Kernstown ===
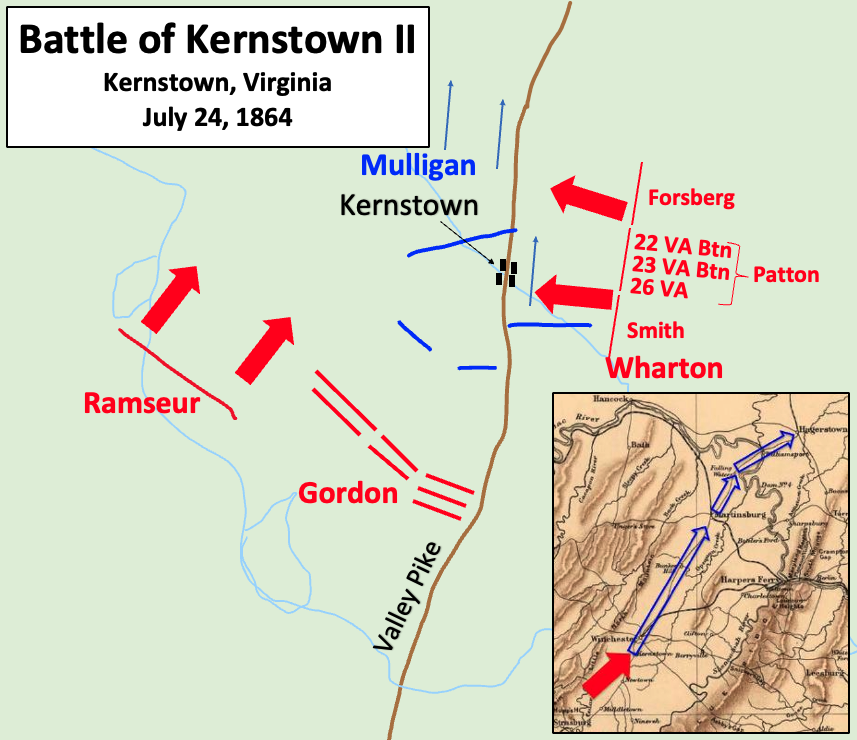
Patton's Brigade was part of Wharton's Division that flanked the Union army

During the last week of July, a Union army led by Brigadier General George Crook occupied Winchester, Virginia. Crook believed Early's army was in full retreat to Richmond despite contrary reports from his cavalry commanders. On July 23, Early received news that Union troops had left the Shenandoah Valley with the exception of George Crook's undersized army. Early's response was to attack. At 4:00 am on July 24, Early's troops began moving from Strasburg north toward Winchester to fight in the Second Battle of Kernstown. Breckinridge's Corps led the way.

By 11:30 am, Breckinridge's Division (commanded by Wharton) was covertly deployed along the east side of the Valley Pike facing west, while Major General John B. Gordon's Division faced north mostly on the west side of the pike. When Breckinridge ordered the men forward, Patton's Brigade (including Derrick's Battalion) was temporarily held back in reserve while the other two battalions, commanded by Colonel Augustus Forsberg and Colonel Thomas A. Smith, advanced. When the Union left flank passed in front of Patton's brigade, the entire division opened fire. The 36th Ohio Infantry Regiment received most of the Confederate fire, and had 136 casualties in only 10 minutes. Casualties for Breckinridge's Division for the entire battle were 75 to 100.

Discovering Confederate soldiers on three sides, Union division commander Colonel James A. Mulligan decided to conduct a fighting withdrawal. Moving back only a short distance, he was wounded in the thigh and forced to dismount. While urging his men to continue the retreat without him, he was shot twice more, including a shot to the chest that would eventually be fatal. Smith's and Patton's brigades chased retreating Union infantry while Forsberg's battalion fought Union cavalry. Crook's men retreated north through Winchester, and the pike became littered with burning wagons. Crook's men eventually retreated across the Potomac River. The Confederate pursuit ended on July 25 in a cold hard rain. Union casualties were about 1,200, while Confederate casualties were about 600. Breckinridge's division would have more casualties from skirmishing in late August, when it fought Union cavalry near Kearneysville. During the month, Major Blessing from Derrick's Battalion was hospitalized in Harrisonburg.

=== Shenandoah Valley ===
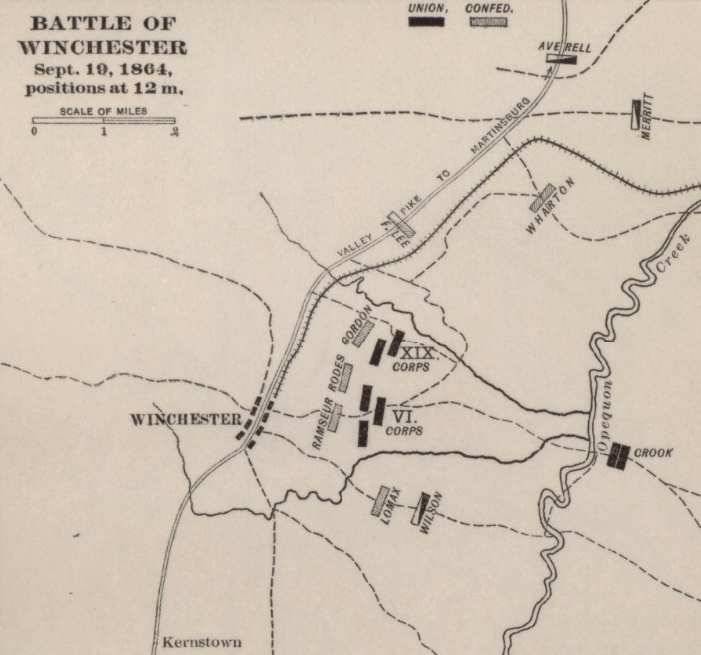
Patton's Brigade was part of Wharton's Division on the northeast side of Winchester

The Third Battle of Winchester occurred on September 19. In this battle, Early's Army of the Valley consisted of multiple corps, and Breckinridge commanded one of them. Breckinridge's Division was commanded by Brigadier General Gabriel C. Wharton, and Patton's Brigade was one of three brigades under Wharton's command. Patton's Brigade consisted of the 22nd Virginia Infantry Regiment and the 23rd and 26th Virginia Infantry battalions. Patton's fighting occurred on the north side of the battlefield. During the morning, Wharton's Division held off a Union cavalry division commanded by Brigadier General Wesley Merritt. After noon, another Union cavalry division, led by Brigadier General William W. Averell, threatened Wharton's rear. Wharton withdrew toward Winchester with Patton's Brigade covering. A Confederate infantry captain later noted in his diary that "after the withdrawal of Breckinridge's Division, the disasters began".

After 1:00 pm, Patton's Brigade was detached to assist Major General Fitzhugh Lee and cavalry on the north side of town near Rutherford's Farm along the pike. Late afternoon found Patton's Brigade closer to town near what became known as the "Second Woods". Here the brigade faced an infantry division from Brigadier General George Crook's Army of West Virginia. While Crook's 2nd Infantry Division was facing Patton, Devin's Cavalry Brigade attacked Patton's left using sabers. In fierce fighting, Devin captured 300 men and all three battle flags from the two battalions and one regiment in Patton's Brigade. Derrick received a saber wound, and was run over by Devin's 9th New York Cavalry Regiment. Both of Patton's battalion commanders, Derrick and Edgar, were captured. Confederate artillery located further south fired into the mass of fighters—hitting friend and foe, but stopping Devin. (Note: Clarence Derrick was imprisoned at Fort Delaware. He was released on June 24, 1865, and subsequently practiced law in Alabama.)

The soldiers from Patton's Brigade that were not captured or killed reformed closer to Winchester behind a stone fence where another division (Gordon) had already reformed perpendicular to the pike. Gordon's Division, Patton's Brigade, and others had all experienced significant losses. Hundreds of men did not rally at the stone fence, but instead retreated into Winchester. Patton was mortally wounded and captured in Winchester while trying to rally remnants of his brigade. For Early, the battle ended with the "combat prowess" of his army "seriously impaired". Further south, fighting began again several days later at the Battle of Fisher's Hill. Early lost another commander as Breckinridge was recalled to duty elsewhere. Early's army was again defeated and fled further south.

After five months of fighting, Patton's Brigade was decimated. On May 6 it had 2,150 men and a full complement of officers. A September 29 inspection report listed only 266 men available for duty. Brigade commander Patton was dead. Battalion commanders Derrick and Edgar were captured. The brigade had no officers ranked higher than captain, and many of the company officers had also been killed, captured, or wounded. The 23rd Virginia Infantry Battalion was commanded by Captain John M. Pratt, and Patton's/Echols' Brigade was commanded by Captain Edmund S. Read. The 23rd Virginia Infantry Battalion had only 78 enlisted men present for duty plus five staff and officers. The inspection report noted that the brigade "is charged at almost every camp for burning rails", and requested that axes be supplied. For the Battle of Cedar Creek on October 19, the remnants of the brigade were present as part of Wharton's Division. Located on the Confederate right near the Valley Pike, Wharton and Brigadier General John Pegram's divisions were driven back in a Union counterattack that used artillery and cavalry. Major Blessing eventually returned to lead Derrick's Battalion. A November 30, 1864, report for Early's Army of the Valley listed Major William Blessing as commander of the 23rd Virginia Infantry Battalion. The brigade commander was Lieutenant Colonel John C. McDonald, and Wharton was division commander.

== War's end ==
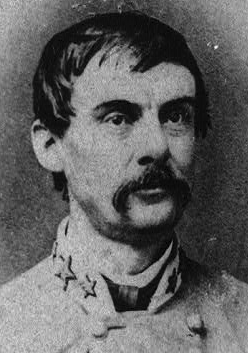
John Echols

In the winter of 1865, Derrick's Battalion was part of Echol's Brigade in the Department of West Virginia and East Tennessee. Although the brigade consisted of what was left of the same three units, Breckinridge and Wharton were not part of this department. Echols was the department head, and his headquarters was in Wytheville, Virginia. A report dated February 28, 1865, confirmed the battalion as part of Echols Brigade along with the 22nd Virginia Infantry Regiment and the 26th Virginia Infantry Battalion. The brigade was part of the Department of Western Virginia and East Tennessee, and it was also commanded by Echols.

The February winter quarters for the battalion was about three miles (4.8 km) northeast of Saltville, Virginia. In March, Blessing led a detachment of 300 men that guarded prisoners being sent to Richmond. On April 2, Echols began moving his command east to unite with Lee and the Army of Northern Virginia. He reached Christiansburg, Virginia, on April 10 where he received a dispatch that said Lee had surrendered. Part of the force decided to attempt to unite with General Joseph E. Johnston's army in North Carolina, while many of the men went home. The 23rd Virginia Infantry Battalion, also known as Derrick's Battalion, was disbanded in mid-April.

== See also ==
- List of Virginia Civil War units
- List of West Virginia Civil War Confederate units

== Notes ==
=== References ===
- Davis, George B.; Perry, Leslie J.; Kirkley, Joseph W., eds. (1893). The War of the Rebellion: a Compilation of the Official Records of the Union and Confederate Armies – Series I Volume XLIII Part I – Reports, Correspondence, etc. Washington, DC: Government Printing Office. OCLC 318422190. Archived from the original on December 18, 2022.
- Davis, George B.; Perry, Leslie J.; Kirkley, Joseph W., eds. (1893b). The War of the Rebellion: a Compilation of the Official Records of the Union and Confederate Armies – Series I Volume XLIII Part II – Correspondence, etc. Washington, DC: Government Printing Office. OCLC 318422190. Archived from the original on December 23, 2022.
- Davis, George B.; Perry, Leslie J.; Kirkley, Joseph W., eds. (1894a). The War of the Rebellion: a Compilation of the Official Records of the Union and Confederate Armies – Series I Volume XLVI Part I – Reports. Washington, DC: Government Printing Office. OCLC 427057. Archived from the original on December 29, 2022.
- Davis, George B.; Perry, Leslie J.; Kirkley, Joseph W., eds. (1894c). The War of the Rebellion: a Compilation of the Official Records of the Union and Confederate Armies – Series I Volume XLVI Part III – Correspondence, etc. Washington, DC: Government Printing Office. OCLC 427057. Archived from the original on December 27, 2022.
- Davis, George B.; Perry, Leslie J.; Kirkley, Joseph W., eds. (1897). The War of the Rebellion: a Compilation of the Official Records of the Union and Confederate Armies – Series I Volume XLIX Part I – Reports, Correspondence, etc. Washington, DC: Government Printing Office. OCLC 427057. Archived from the original on December 27, 2022.
- Duncan, Richard R. (1998). Lee's Endangered Left: The Civil War in Western Virginia, Spring of 1864. Baton Rouge, Louisiana: Louisiana State University Press. OCLC 940541407.
- Davis, William C. (1983). The Battle of New Market. Baton Rouge, Louisiana: Louisiana State University Press. ISBN 978-0-80711-078-2. OCLC 1222884269.
- Evans, Clement A., ed. (1899). Confederate Military History: A library of Confederate States History.... (Volume II). Atlanta, Georgia: Confederate Publishing Company. OCLC 951143. Archived from the original on May 26, 2022.
- Hogan, David W. (2014). The Overland Campaign, 4 May - 15 June 1864. Washington, D.C.: Center of Military History, United States Army. ISBN 9780160925177. OCLC 883656765. Archived from the original on 9 February 2023.
- Knight, Charles R. (2010). Valley Thunder: The Battle of New Market and the Opening of the Shenandoah Valley Campaign, May 1864. New York, New York: Savas Beatie. ISBN 978-1-61121-054-5. OCLC 763157018.
- Krick, Robert K. (2006). "The Confederate Pattons". In Gallagher, Gary W. (ed.). The Shenandoah Valley Campaign of 1864. Chapel Hill, North Carolina: University of North Carolina Press. pp. 341–369. ISBN 978-0-80783-005-5. OCLC 62281619.
- Lewis, Thomas A. (1997). The Guns of Cedar Creek. Strasburg, Virginia: Heritage Associates. OCLC 42688338.
- Lowry, Terry (1996). Last Sleep: The Battle of Droop Mountain, November 6, 1863. Charleston, West Virginia: Pictorial Histories Publishing Company. ISBN 978-1-57510-024-1. OCLC 36488613.
- Lowry, Terry (2016). The Battle of Charleston and the 1862 Kanawha Valley campaign. Charleston, West Virginia: 35th Star Publishing. ISBN 978-0-96645-348-5. OCLC 981250860.
- Patchan, Scott C. (2007). Shenandoah Summer: The 1864 Valley Campaign. Lincoln, Nebraska: University of Nebraska Press. ISBN 978-0-8032-0700-4. OCLC 122563754.
- Patchan, Scott C. (2013). The Last Battle of Winchester: Phil Sheridan, Jubal Early, and the Shenandoah Valley Campaign, August 7 - September 19, 1864. Havertown, Pennsylvania: Savas Beatie. ISBN 978-1-61121-064-4. OCLC 857365201.
- Pendleton, William C. (1920). History of Tazewell County and Southwest Virginia : 1748-1920. Richmond, Virginia: W. C. Hill Printing Company. OCLC 1652100. Archived from the original on January 8, 2023.
- Scott, Robert N., ed. (1890). The War of the Rebellion: a Compilation of the Official Records of the Union and Confederate Armies Series I Volume XXIX Part I. Washington, DC: Government Printing Office. OCLC 318422190. Archived from the original on 2023-02-09.
- Scott, Robert N., ed. (1891). The War of the Rebellion: a Compilation of the Official Records of the Union and Confederate Armies Series I Volume XXXIII Part I. Washington, DC: Government Printing Office. OCLC 318422190. Archived from the original on 2022-12-31.
- Shaara, Jeff (2006). Jeff Shaara's Civil War Battlefields. New York, New York: Ballantine Books. ISBN 978-0-34546-488-0. OCLC 1267611677.
- Snell, Mark A. (2012). West Virginia and the Civil War : Mountaineers are Always Free. Charleston, SC: History Press. ISBN 978-1-61423-390-9. OCLC 829025932.
- Starr, Stephen Z. (2007). Union Cavalry in the Civil War. Baton Rouge: Louisiana State University Press. ISBN 978-0-8071329-1-3. OCLC 153582839.
- Wallace, Lee A. (1986). A Guide to Virginia Military Organizations 1861-1865. Lynchburg, Virginia: H.E. Howard, Inc. ISBN 978-0-93091-930-6. OCLC 1003746760.
- Wert, Jeffry D. (2010). From Winchester to Cedar Creek: The Shenandoah Campaign of 1864. Carbondale, Illinois: Southern Illinois University Press. ISBN 978-0-80932-972-4. OCLC 463454602.
- Whitehorne, Joseph W.A.; Center of Military History, United States Army (1988). The Battle of New Market. Washington, DC: Center of Military History, United States Army. OCLC 1153258627. Archived from the original on December 27, 2022.
- Wittenberg, Eric J. (2011). The Battle of White Sulphur Springs: Averell Fails to Secure West Virginia. Charleston, South Carolina: History Press. ISBN 978-1-61423-326-8. OCLC 795566215.
