= 26th Virginia Infantry Battalion =

26th Virginia Infantry Battalion (Edgar's Battalion)
- Flag of Virginia, 1861
- Active: May 1862 – April 1865
- Disbanded: 1865
- Allegiance: Confederate States of America
- Branch: Confederate States Army
- Type: Infantry
- Nickname(s): Edgar's Battalion
- Engagements: American Civil War 1862: Battle of Lewisburg, Battle of Fayetteville (1862 Western Virginia); 1863: Battle of White Sulphur Springs, Battle of Droop Mountain 1864: Battle of New Market, Battle of North Anna, Battle of Cold Harbor, Battle of Monocacy, Third Battle of Winchester, Battle of Fisher's Hill, Battle of Cedar Creek

Commanders
- Lt. Colonel: George M. Edgar
- Major: Richard Woodram

The 26th Virginia Infantry Battalion was a unit of the Confederate States Army organized on May 20, 1862 from men of the 59th Virginia Infantry Regiment who were not captured at the Battle of Roanoke Island and additional companies of recruits. It was commanded by Lt. Col. George M. Edgar and, after his capture in 1864, by Capt. Edmund S. Read. The battalion was disbanded on April 12, 1865 by Brig. Gen. John Echols at Christiansburg, Va.

== Organization ==
Capt. George M. Edgar organized the battalion in the spring of 1862 from men of the 59th Virginia who had escaped capture at the Battle of Roanoke Island, as well as men who had remained behind in western Virginia. Edgar's new company was composed mostly of men from the late Capt. Fleshman's company. After his successful reorganization Edgar was authorized to raise a battalion in western Virginia with his new company, Co. D, as the nucleus.

The battalion was organized on May 20, 1862 but was not officially designated until October 1862. It was organized by Special Order No. 244 to prevent Gen. Wise from transferring the companies to his brigade from Gen. Echols command. Four more companies were added in 1864, the battalion consisting primarily of men from Greenbrier, Mercer, Monroe, Kanawha and Pulaski counties. Edgar was promoted to the rank of major in May and in November to lt.-colonel. Richard Woodram was commissioned major of the battalion.

The battalion was assigned to the command of Henry Heth, which itself was transferred to John Echols and later to William W. Loring. Their first battle was at Lewisburg, where Edgar was severely wounded, causing the battalion to break and retreat, resulting in a collapse of Confederate defenses and a Union victory. The battalions' reputation suffered as a consequence and it was not until 15 months later at the Battle of White Sulphur Springs when they were able to redeem it and earn the praise of Col. George S. Patton.

The battalion took part in Loring's Kanawha Valley Campaign of 1862 in September 1862, and in 1863 they provided cover for the returning troops after the Jones-Imboden raid. In August 1863 the battalion, along with the 22nd Virginia Infantry Regiment and the 23rd Battalion were assigned to the brigade of John Echols, under the overall command of Col. Patton.

In 1864 Patton's command was transferred to Maj. Gen. John C. Breckinridge and they moved out of western Virginia for the duration of the war. They would suffer their heaviest casualties at Cold Harbor. At the Third Battle of Winchester Col. Edgar was captured and the battalion was commanded by Major Read until Edgar's return in January 1865. They remained in southwestern Virginia until the end of the war when they were disbanded after Lee's surrender at Appomattox. Col. Edgar however, with some of his men, sought to continue their service under Joseph E. Johnston in North Carolina, but Johnston himself soon surrendered.

The battalion had 1,371 men during its existence, suffering 48 men killed in action, 147 wounded, 348 captured, 21 missing in action, 174 dying of disease. There were 36 medical discharges, 8 resignations and 272 desertions. Another 5 men were killed in a railroad accident.

Companies of the 26th Virginia Infantry Battalion
Company	Name	History
A	Charleston Sharpshooters	Kanawha County; formerly Swann's Co., 22nd Regt., and Co. E, 59th Regt., Capt. John S. Swann.
B	Capt. Edmund S. Read's Co.	Greenbrier & Monroe counties; organized April 29, 1862 and composed partly of men who had previously served in the 59th Regt.
C	Capt. Thomas W. Thompson's Co.	Mercer County; organized April 29, 1862, composed of former members of the 59th Regt.; company is reported to have been divided June 12, 1863 and formed Co. H. 26th Battalion. Captains: Thomas W. Thompson, James H. Peck.
D	Capt. George M. Edgar's Co.	Greenbrier & Monroe counties; formerly Co. D, 59th Regt.; reorganized March 29, 1862; records show that Co. H, organized June 12, 1863. was composed partly of men transferred from this company. Captains: George M. Edgar, Frank C. Burdett.
E	Capt. William D. Hefner's Co.	Greenbrier County; organized March 24, 1862, for 3 years or for the war. Captains: William D. Hefner, Jos. Scott, Daniel Hefner.
F	Red Sulphur Yankee Hunters	Monroe County; formerly Co. C (1st), 59th Regt.; reorganized March 29, 1862; records show that Co. H, organized June 12, 1863, was composed partly of men transferred from this company. Captains: Richard Woodram, Thomas C. Morton.
G	White Sulphur Rifles	Greenbrier & Monroe counties; formerly Co. B (2nd), 59th Regt.. Captain Z.F. Morris.
H	Capt. James Dunlap's Co.	Monroe County; organized June 12, 1863; formed from transfers from various companies of this battalion.
I	Capt. John O. Carr's Co.	Pulaski County; organized June 6, 1863; some members were reported to have been enlisted as early as July 21, 1862, for the war; prior service of company has not been identified.
