= 8th West Virginia Infantry Regiment =

Infantry regiment in the Union Army during the American Civil War

- Flag of West Virginia
- Active: November, 1861 to January 26, 1864
- Country: United States
- Allegiance: Union
- Branch: Infantry
- Engagements: Battle of Cross Keys; Battle of Second Bull Run; Battle of White Sulphur Springs; Battle of Droop Mountain

Commanders
- Colonel: John H. Oley
- Major: Hedgman Slack

The 8th West Virginia Infantry Regiment was an infantry regiment that served in the Union Army during the American Civil War. It was organized in November 1861 with recruits from the Kanawha River Valley region, and eventually served in Virginia and what–is–now West Virginia. Major John H. Oley organized the regiment and eventually became its colonel.

In 1862 the regiment served in an army commanded by Major General John C. Frémont. It was part of a brigade used for reconnaissance and as the army's vanguard. Later in the year, the regiment served in the Army of Virginia under the command of Major General John Pope.

After becoming part of a brigade commanded by Brigadier General William W. Averell, the regiment became a mounted infantry during June 1863. It fought in the Battle of White Sulphur Springs and the Battle of Droop Mountain. Both of these battles were located in West Virginia not far from the border with Virginia. On January 26, 1864, the mounted infantry regiment was converted to the 7th West Virginia Cavalry Regiment.

== Service ==
The 8th West Virginia Infantry Regiment was organized in Buffalo, West Virginia in November 1861 and attached to the District of the Kanawha, with men recruited from the central and southern counties of Braxton, Clay, Jackson, Kanawha, Putnam, Raleigh, Fayette, Boone, Logan and Wyoming.

Originally known as the 8th Virginia Regiment of the Union Army, it became the 8th West Virginia when West Virginia was designated a state.

The unit fought at the Battle of Cross Keys under Lt. Colonel Lucien Loeser as a part of Cluseret's Brigade, alongside the 60th Ohio under overall command of Col. Gustave Paul Clusteret, a French officer who served with the Union Army.

During May 1863, the regiment was converted to a mounted infantry by Brigadier General William W. Averell. The regiment was immediately sent to a camp for instruction and supplied. On January 26, 1864, the 8th West Virginia was reorganized into a cavalry regiment, the 7th West Virginia Cavalry. It was mustered out on August 1, 1865.

== See also ==
- West Virginia Units in the Civil War
- West Virginia in the Civil War
