= 22nd Virginia Infantry Regiment =

22nd Regiment, Virginia Infantry
- Flag of Virginia, 1861
- Active: July 1861 – Spring 1865
- Disbanded: 1865
- Country: Confederate States of America
- Allegiance: Virginia
- Branch: Confederate States Army
- Type: Infantry
- Engagements: American Civil War: Scary Creek; Battle of Kessler's Cross Lanes; Carnifex Ferry; Sewell Mountain; Siege of Cotton Hill; Skirmish at Giles Courthouse; Lewisburg; Jones-Imboden Raid; Fayetteville; Charleston; White Sulphur Springs; Droop Mountain; Shenandoah Valley; New Market; Cool Spring; Second Kernstown; Third Winchester; Fisher's Hill; Cedar Creek

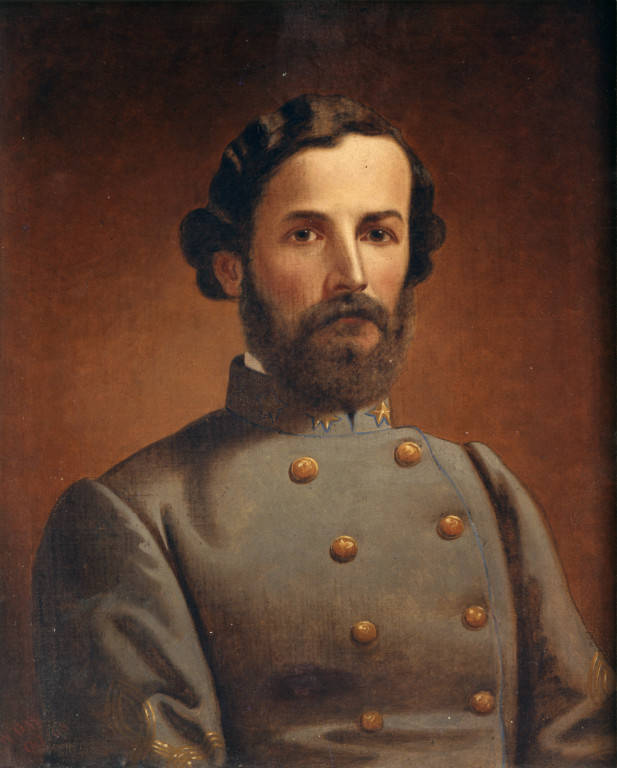
Portrait of Col. George S. Patton by William D. Washington, circa 1861

The 22nd Virginia Infantry Regiment was an infantry regiment from western Virginia that served in the Confederate States Army during the American Civil War. Its commander was George S. Patton Sr., the grandfather of World War II General George S. Patton.

== Organization ==
22nd Infantry Regiment, formerly known as the 1st Kanawha Regiment, was organized and accepted into Confederate service in July 1861. Its members were from the counties of Jackson, Kanawha, Putnam, Fayette, Monroe, Craig, Nicholas, Alleghany, Wyoming, Greenbrier, Clay, Putnam, Roane, Greene and Boone.

== Companies and officers ==
Sortable table
Company	Nickname	Recruited at	First (then later) Commanding Officer
A	Border Rifles	Putnam County	Andrew Russell Barbee; John Koontz Thompson
B	Mountain Cove Guards	Fayette County	William Tyree; Henry B. Dickenson; T.A. Nutter later became Company C and Company F became Company B
C	Fayetteville Rifles	Fayette County	Company B combined with and became Company C; after reorganization the original Company F became Company B
D	Nicholas Blues	Nicholas County	Winston Shelton; James M. McNeill
E	Elk River Tigers	Kanawha County; Clay County; Roane Counties	Thomas Belt Swann; George Steptoe Chilton
F	Border Rifles	Jackson County	William H. Lipscomb; Benjamin Chase; James C. Johns; Became Company B after reorganization
G	Rocky Point Grays	Monroe and Alleghany Counties	Lewis Franklin Watts; John Campbell; James H. Shumate; Company F after reorganization
H	Wyoming Rifemen	Wyoming County	Erastus A. Duncan; James A. Cook; Montraville P. Roach
I	Kanawha Riflemen	Kanawha County	George S. Patton Sr. David Ruffner; Richard S.W. Laidley; John P. Donaldson
K	Boone Company	Boone County	William S. Chandler; John P. Toney reorganized as Company I
K2	Lewis' company or Huddleston's cavalry	Kanawha and Fayette Counties	Christopher Q. Tompkins; Thomas Huddleston; Irvine Lewis reassigned to 8th Virginia Cavalry
K3	Fayetteville Rifles	Kanawha County	Robert Augustus Bailey; John Claiborne McDonald; William Frederick Bahlmann; Martin L. Smiley

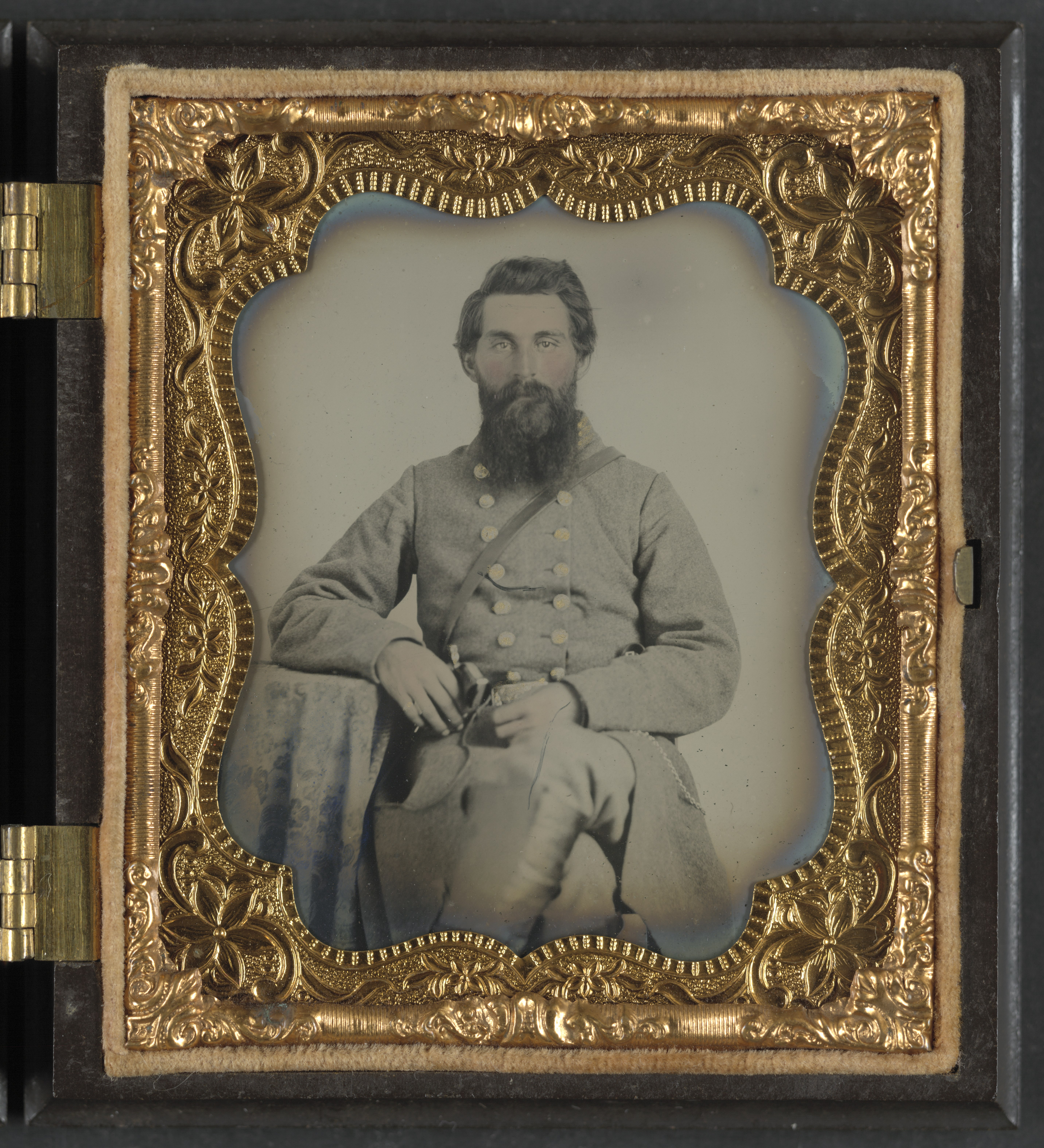
Captain Joel Houghton Abbott of Co. K, 22nd Virginia Infantry Regiment

Also, three other units were reassigned and did not really fight with this unit. The Charleston Sharpshooters (also referred to as Swann's Company) was organized by Charleston lawyer John Sterling Swann in December 1859 and worked together with the Kanawha Riflemen before secession. After being mustered into service on April 25, 1861, they were transferred and mustered into the Confederate States Army as Company K of the 59th Virginia Infantry in July, then detached and made Company A of the 26th Virginia Infantry.

The Bruce Rifles (also referred to as Taylor's Company or the Greenbrier Rifles) was organized in Greenbrier County by Col. Jacob N. Taylor, and mustered into Virginia service in June 1861. Transferred to the Wise Legion on July 10 with the consent of Col. Charles Q. Tompkins, they became Company F of the 46th Virginia Infantry and in August 1861 were transferred again and became Company E of the 60th Virginia Infantry

The Kanawha Artillery (also referred to as Hale's Battery) was organized in Charleston by Dr. John Peter Hale, who also financed it at the suggestion of then-Col. John McCausland. Mustered into Virginia service in June 1861, their new cannon cast at the Kanawha Salines purportedly changed the Battle of Scary Creek on June 3, although Lt. James Clark Welch would become the unit's first casualty (and possibly of the South). By July it became Capt. Thomas E. Jackson's Company Virginia Light Artillery.

== Service ==
The 22nd saw action at Carnifex Ferry and later lost twenty-one percent of the 550 engaged at Droop Mountain. It was assigned to Echols' and Patton's Brigade, participated in the Shenandoah Valley operations, and disbanded during the spring of 1865.

In 1859 the Militia unit changed its name permanently to the Kanawha Riflemen. As the Civil War began in western Virginia the 22nd was known as the 1st Kanawha Riflemen upon entering into service of the Confederacy in June 1861. The 22nd Virginia was formed under Captain Patton. Captain Patton later commissioned to be Colonel of the 22nd Virginia in the Army of Kanawha under Generals Henry Wise, who was a former Governor of Virginia.

The first Baptism of Fire came on July 17, 1861, at the Battle of Scary Creek. Captain George Patton won a major victory for the Confederates, and he was wounded in the shoulder, he was left at Charleston, West Virginia. During his absence, the 22nd Virginia was placed under the command of Colonel Christopher Q. Tompkins.

The infighting between Wise and John B. Floyd (also a former Governor of Virginia himself who had been sent to the Kanawha Valley) and the disorder of the Confederate forces caused President Jefferson Davis to send General Robert E. Lee to the region to supervise. Following the unsuccessful attack to take Cheat Mountain to the north, Lee moved south to take command of the Army of the Kanawha Valley District after Floyd's defeat at Carnifex Ferry on September 10, 1861. Prior to Carnifex Ferry, Floyd sent a dispatch to General Wise stating he needed support in order to keep his position. General Wise denied the arrival of part of his army until another dispatch came, this time begging for support. General Wise detached the 22nd Virginia to aid Floyd. By the time the 22nd Virginia arrived on the scene it was too late and Floyd was forced to retreat. General Lee went to settle the differences of these two generals. General Lee's objective was to push the Union Army back into Ohio.

After his weak assault on Sewell Mountain General Lee had General Wise removed from Western Virginia and transferred to North Carolina. General Lee then decided to have the 22nd transferred to General Floyd's Army of Southwestern Virginia.

In the early part of 1862, after the Romney Campaign, Floyd transferred to Tennessee and General Henry Heth took over as the commanding officer of the Army of New River under General William W. Loring's Department of Southwestern Virginia. The small force won at the Battle of Giles Court House on May 10, 1862, but were quickly overrun at the Battle of Lewisburg on May 23, 1862. General Heth was very disliked by the members of the 22nd Virginia. Reasons behind this disliking started at Lewisburg. General Heth misjudged the numbers of the Union Army under General Crook, which led to ultimate disaster. During the battle the Union Army managed to take possession of a Confederate cannon, which dated back to the Revolutionary War and was the cannon that the British has surrendered at Yorktown. It finally boiled over when General Heth's army started to disobey orders. In September, the regiment fought in Major General William W. Loring's Kanawha Valley Campaign of 1862 as part of a brigade commanded by Brigadier General John S. Williams or detached to a brigade commanded by Colonel Gabriel C. Wharton.

General John Echols reformed the Army of South Western Virginia in the spring of 1863. The 22nd Virginia spent the spring on a series of raids called the Jones and Imboden Raid. The raid went completely around West Virginia and entered Oakland, Maryland. The purpose of the raid was to destroy the over hangs where the B&O Railroad was vital. On April 24, the raid carried over to Beverly, West Virginia. Once settled in Beverly, the 22nd Virginia was engaged in a skirmish that captured several Union troops and supplies. During the month of August, the 22nd Virginia was stationed near Lewisburg. White Sulphur Springs was the place of a famous health spa and a scene of a huge battle (the Battle of White Sulphur Springs) between The 22nd Virginia and Federal forces under the command of General Averell. The federal objective was to seize the law books at the Virginia State Law Library at Lewisburg. These books contained information on the Virginia Supreme Court of Appeals for the convenience of lawyers and judges. Colonel Patton marched his army down Anthony's Creek Road and the Union army went by way of James River Pike. The two forces met at the intersection of where these two roads met. Colonel Patton deployed his men at once, blocking the road. The battle lasted all day and carried over to the following day. Both armies were running low on supplies, and the Federal army was forced to withdraw from the field. Colonel Patton had a decisive victory for the Confederates.

The Battle of Droop Mountain occurred on November 6, 1863. At dawn the Union Army under the command of General Averell, sent out skirmishers to test the Confederate line. The Confederates there, held the ground and this forced General Averell to send a detachment of troops to the west where they were ordered to attack the Confederate left. Echols was aware of the situation even though the center and the right were heavily engaged, and ordered the left flank to be reinforced. Sending out the 23rd Virginia Battalion to support the Confederate left. Seeing the Confederate right and center falling back, Echols sent three companies of the 22nd Virginia to support the left flank. Patton informed Echols that the left flank was on the verge of collapse. As the order of retreat was called to the Confederates, Colonel Jackson held the center for another half hour until the artillery was removed from the field. The Confederates retreated into the woods and disappeared from sight. Even though the battle of Droop Mountain was a Confederate defeat, Echols managed to survive from the main thrust of the Union Army and prevented Averell from completing their raid on the Virginia and Tennessee Railroad.

After the battle of Droop Mountain, (West) Virginia in November 1863 the Army of South Western Virginia was almost destroyed. In 1864 the 22nd Virginia was transferred to General John C. Breckinridge to protect the Shenandoah Valley from the invading Federals. In May at New Market, Virginia the 22nd made a stand next to the V.M.I.'s, which was the 22nd's biggest victory. By late spring the 22nd Virginia was called to Richmond, Virginia to take part in protecting the Confederate Capital at Cold Harbor, as Grant's Army was invading the state once again, this time not retreating as previous generals have done in the past. Western Virginia would never be claimed by her mother state of Virginia again and General Lee needed men desperately. This led to the 22nd Virginia Infantry being pulled from West Virginia.

By the summer of 1864 the 22nd Virginia went with the Army of the Valley to rid the Yankees, under General Franz Sigel, from Lynchburg, Virginia. They also went into the Shenandoah Valley to relieve some of the pressure off of General Lee's lines and force Grant to send troops away from Petersburg. Therefore, the 22nd Virginia would soon be part of a raid that would attack Washington (DC). The 22nd Virginia left Petersburg during June 1864 to attack the Federals there and relieve pressure of Federal occupation of the town. The first task was completed with the liberation of Lynchburg. General Jubal Early then traveled up the Shenandoah Valley and entered Maryland at Shepherdstown, West Virginia.

Once there the raid carried over to Hagerstown with the demand of 20, 000 dollars from the town. The officer in charge misunderstood the order and accidentally forgot to add an extra zero to that number. On July 8 at Turners Gap, near Middletown MD, the 22nd Virginia engaged in a series of skirmishes that finally ended at Frederick, Maryland in the late evening. On July 9 the 22nd Virginia served as reserves during the battle of Monocacy. July 11, the 22nd Virginia was called out at Fort Stevens, three miles from the White House. The battle was called off the following day. Early retreated to White's Ford and entered Leesburg, Virginia. Once Early entered the Shenandoah Valley, the 22nd Virginia participated in the battles of Cool Springs, Kernstown, and Winchester. On September 16, during the retreat from Winchester, Colonel George Patton was wounded and taken prisoner. By September 25, Colonel Patton died refusing amputation to his leg.

At the Battle of Cedar Creek, the 22nd Virginia had almost been wiped out, as they had about 140 soldiers left in the ranks. After Cedar Creek, Early was removed from command along with Breckinridge. General John Echols was given command of what was left of the Army of South Western Virginia and the Army of the Valley. Both armies made a last attempt to regain control of West Virginia and failed. By 1865 the armies did not have enough manpower and started for Lynchburg to rejoin General Lee. On April 15 a telegram was sent to the 22nd Virginia Infantry telling them that General Lee had surrendered at Appomattox, Virginia. By that time the 22nd Virginia had already started to disband. Other members of the 22nd Virginia, who still wanted to fight, were marching off for Tennessee. The last company to disband was Company H, when they received word that General Johnston had surrendered in North Carolina at the Bennett Place.

By 1864, the influence of peace party and pro-Union organizations, particularly the Red Strings, into the 22nd Virginia Infantry and the 54th Virginia Infantry was unknown. Secretary of War James Seddon investigated the allegations.

== See also ==
- List of Virginia Civil War units
- List of West Virginia Civil War Confederate units

== Bibliography ==
- Brown, Joseph Alleine, and Samuel Hunter Austin. The Memoirs of a Confederate Soldier. Abingdon, Va: Forum Press, 1940.
- [Captain Joel Houghton Abbott of Co. K, 22nd Virginia Infantry Regiment, and Co. H, 8th Virginia Cavalry Regiment]. Ambrotype/Tintype Filing Series (Library of Congress). 1861. http://www.worldcat.org/oclc/806193315
- Confederate States of America. General Orders. [Findings and Sentence of a Military Court at Which Private Granville S. McCutchen, Company C, 22d Va. Volunteers, Was Arraigned and Tried]. No. 52 No. 52. [Richmond]: [The Office], 1863. http://www.worldcat.org/oclc/686733757
- Lowry, Terry. 22nd Virginia Infantry. Lynchburg, Va: H.E. Howard, 1991.
- Smith, Isaac Noyes. 1966. "A Virginian's Dilemma (the Civil War Diary of Isaac Noyes Smith, in Which He Describes the Activities of the 22nd Regiment of Virginia Volunteers, Sept. to Nov. 1861)". West Virginia History. 27, no. 3: 173–200.
- Swann, John S. Reminiscences of John S. Swann. n.d.
- Tompkins family, John Patterson, Christopher Tompkins, and Christopher Quarles Tompkins. Papers: Of the Tompkins Family. 1800.
