= George Edgar (academic) =

Former president of Florida State University

George Matthews Edgar
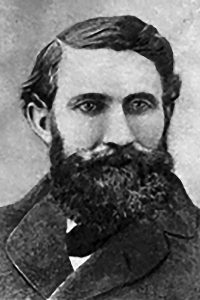

President of Seminary West of the Suwannee River (now named Florida State University)
- In office 1887–1892
- Preceded by: E. R. Weeks
- Succeeded by: Alvin Lewis

Personal details
- Born: March 1, 1837 Union, Virginia, U.S.
- Died: October 18, 1913 (aged 76) Paris, Kentucky, U.S.
- Spouse: Rebecca Fry
- Relatives: Mathews family
- Education: Virginia Military Institute

George Mathews Edgar (March 1, 1837 – October 18, 1913) was the President of the Seminary West of the Suwannee River, in Tallahassee, Florida, an institution which eventually became Florida State University. He served in that office from 1887 to 1892. Edgar first called the West Florida Seminary "Florida State University" during Commencement in June 1891. He was also president of the Arkansas Industrial University (now the University of Arkansas) from 1884 to 1887. He later taught at the University of Alabama and Occidental College in California.

Edgar was born March 1, 1837, at Union, Virginia, and graduated fifth in his class from Virginia Military Institute in 1856. During the Civil War, he served in the Confederate Army. After serving in the 59th Virginia Infantry Regiment, he organized Edgar's Battalion on March 28, 1862. This battalion evolved into the 26th Virginia Infantry Battalion, and he was its major and commander. In November 1862, he was promoted to lieutenant colonel.

He was married to Rebecca Fry, and they had six children. Edgar died at Paris, Kentucky on October 18, 1913.
