= List of Virginia units in the American Civil War =

The flag of Virginia during the American Civil War

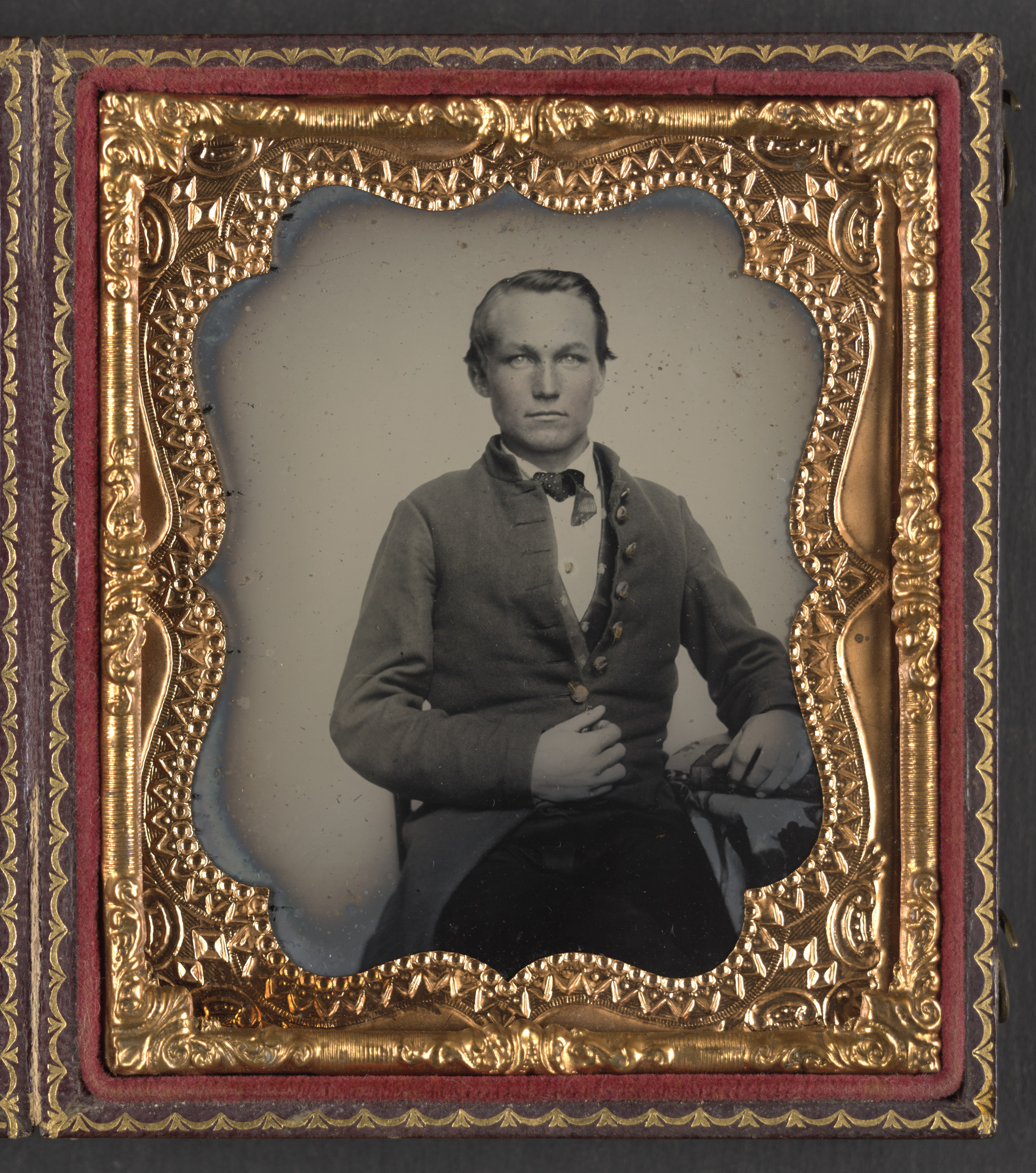
An unidentified soldier in a Confederate States Army uniform with state of Virginia buttons

Virginia provided the following units to the Virginia Militia and the Provisional Army of the Confederate States (PACS), part of the Confederate States Army, during the American Civil War. Despite Virginia's secession from the Union, along with newly created West Virginia, it also supplied 22,000 troops to the Union Army, the third-most troops from a southern state after Tennessee and North Carolina. This list includes Virginia Civil War units to both the Confederate States and Union armies.

== Infantry units (PACS) ==
=== Infantry brigades ===
- 1st Virginia Brigade (Stonewall Brigade)
- 2nd Virginia Brigade
- 3rd Virginia Brigade
- Wise Legion

=== Infantry regiments ===
- 1st Virginia Infantry (Old First)
- 2nd Virginia Infantry (Innocents)
  - Company D, 2nd Virginia Infantry
- 3rd Virginia Infantry
- 4th Virginia Infantry
- 5th Virginia Infantry
- 6th Virginia Infantry
- 7th Virginia Infantry
- 8th Virginia Infantry (The Bloody Eighth)
- 9th Virginia Infantry
- 10th Virginia Infantry
- 11th Virginia Infantry
- 12th Virginia Infantry
- 13th Virginia Infantry
- 14th Virginia Infantry
- 15th Virginia Infantry
- 16th Virginia Infantry
- 17th Virginia Infantry
- 18th Virginia Infantry
- 19th Virginia Infantry
- 20th Virginia Infantry
- 21st Virginia Infantry
- 22nd Virginia Infantry

- 23rd Virginia Infantry
- 24th Virginia Infantry
- 25th Virginia Infantry (Heck's Regiment)
- 26th Virginia Infantry
- 27th Virginia Infantry (The Bloody 27th)
- 28th Virginia Infantry
- 29th Virginia Infantry
- 30th Virginia Infantry
- 31st Virginia Infantry
- 32nd Virginia Infantry
- 33rd Virginia Infantry
- 34th Virginia Infantry
- 35th Virginia Infantry (did not complete organization)
- 36th Virginia Infantry
- 37th Virginia Infantry
- 38th Virginia Infantry
- 39th Virginia Infantry
- 40th Virginia Infantry
- 41st Virginia Infantry
- 42nd Virginia Infantry
- 43rd Virginia Infantry (did not complete organization)
- 44th Virginia Infantry
- 45th Virginia Infantry

- 46th Virginia Infantry
- 47th Virginia Infantry
- 48th Virginia Infantry
- 49th Virginia Infantry (Extra Billy Smith's Boys)
- 50th Virginia Infantry
- 51st Virginia Infantry
- 52nd Virginia Infantry
- 53rd Virginia Infantry
- 54th Virginia Infantry
- 55th Virginia Infantry
- 56th Virginia Infantry
- 57th Virginia Infantry
- 58th Virginia Infantry
- 59th Virginia Infantry
- 60th Virginia Infantry
- 61st Virginia Infantry
- 62nd Virginia Mounted Infantry (1st Partisan Rangers)
- 63rd Virginia Infantry
- 64th Virginia Mounted Infantry

=== Infantry battalions ===
- 1st Virginia Infantry Battalion (Irish Battalion)
- 2nd Virginia Infantry Battalion
- 5th Virginia Infantry Battalion (Archer's)
- 9th Virginia Infantry Battalion (Hansbrough's)
- 21st Virginia Infantry Battalion (Pound Gap Battalion)
- 22nd Virginia Infantry Battalion
- 23rd Virginia Infantry Battalion (Hounshell's or Derrick's)
- 25th Virginia Infantry Battalion (Richmond City Battalion)
- 26th Virginia Infantry Battalion (Edgar's)
- 28th Virginia Infantry Battalion (Tabb's)
- 30th Virginia Sharpshooters Battalion (Clarke's)
- 44th Virginia Infantry Battalion (Petersburg City Battalion)
- 45th Virginia Infantry Battalion (Beckley's)
- Cohoon's Battalion Virginia Infantry (6th North Carolina Infantry Battalion)
- French's Battalion Virginia Infantry
- Goggin's Battalion Virginia Infantry
- Keen's Battalion Virginia Infantry
- Montague's Battalion Virginia Infantry
- Tomlin's Battalion Virginia Infantry
- Charlottesville and University Battalion Virginia Infantry
- VMI Battalion Virginia Infantry

== Cavalry units (PACS) ==
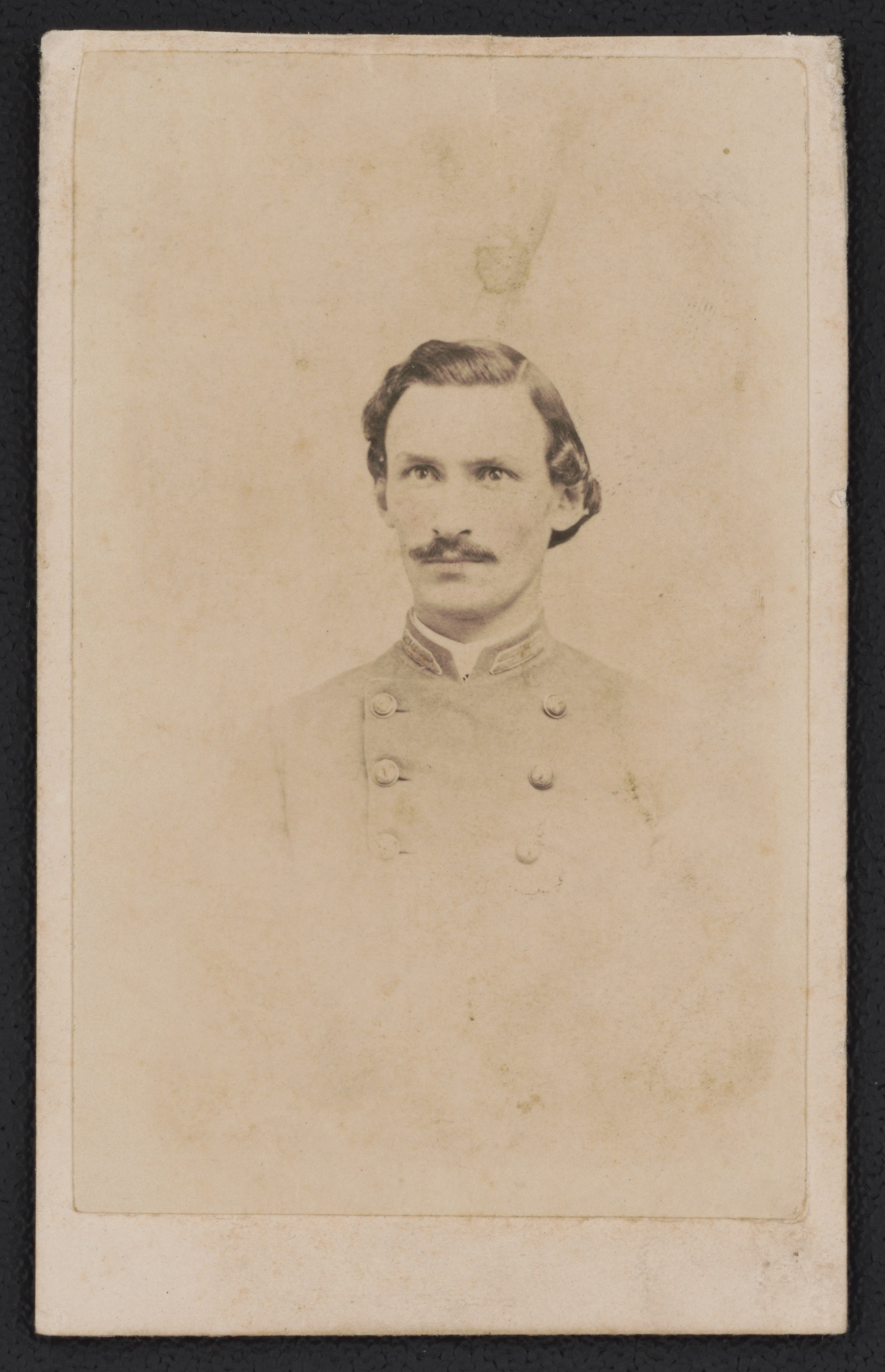
Second Lieutenant Theodore S. Garnett of Co. F, 9th Virginia Cavalry

=== Cavalry brigades ===
- 1st (Stuart's) Virginia Cavalry Brigade
- 2nd Virginia Cavalry Brigade
- 3rd (Wickham's) Virginia Cavalry Brigade
- 4th Virginia Cavalry Brigade (Laurel Brigade)

=== Cavalry regiments ===
- 1st Virginia Cavalry (Jones')
- 2nd Virginia Cavalry (Munford's)
- 3rd Virginia Cavalry
- 4th Virginia Cavalry (Co. H was the Black Horse Cavalry)
- 5th Virginia Cavalry
- 6th Virginia Cavalry
- 7th Virginia Cavalry (Ashby's)
- 8th Virginia Cavalry
- 9th Virginia Cavalry (Johnson's)
- 10th Virginia Cavalry
- 11th Virginia Cavalry
- 12th Virginia Cavalry
- 13th Virginia Cavalry (2 units)
- 14th Virginia Cavalry
- 15th Virginia Cavalry
- 16th Virginia Cavalry
- 17th Virginia Cavalry
- 18th Virginia Cavalry (Partisan Rangers)
- 19th Virginia Cavalry
- 20th Virginia Cavalry
- 21st Virginia Cavalry
- 22nd Virginia Cavalry (Bowen's Mounted Riflemen)
- 23rd Virginia Cavalry
- 24th Virginia Cavalry
- 25th Virginia Cavalry
- 26th Virginia Cavalry
- 64th Virginia Cavalry

=== Cavalry battalions, companies, and mounted rifle guards ===
- 1st Battalion Virginia Cavalry
- 2nd Battalion Virginia Cavalry
- 14th Battalion Virginia Cavalry (Burrough's or Chesapeake)
- 15th Battalion Virginia Cavalry (Critcher's or Northern Neck Rangers)
- 16th Battalion Virginia Cavalry
- 17th Battalion Virginia Cavalry (1st Battalion)
- 32nd Battalion Virginia Cavalry
- 33rd Battalion Virginia Cavalry
- 34th Battalion Virginia Cavalry (Witcher's)
- 35th Battalion Virginia Cavalry (White's Comanches)
- 36th Battalion Virginia Cavalry
- 39th Battalion Virginia Cavalry (Richardson's Battalion of Scouts, Guides, and Couriers)
- 40th Battalion Virginia Cavalry
- 41st Battalion Virginia Cavalry (White's)
- 42nd Battalion Virginia Cavalry
- 46th Battalion Virginia Cavalry
- 47th Battalion Virginia Cavalry
- Caldwell's Battalion Virginia Cavalry
- Ferguson's Battalion Virginia Cavalry (Guyandotte)
- O'Ferrall's Battalion Virginia Cavalry
- Davis' Battalion Virginia Cavalry
- Vandementer's Battalion Virginia Cavalry
- 1st Battalion Virginia Mounted Riflemen
- Varina Troop (Henrico Mounted Rangers)
- 1st Congressional District, Virginia Mounted Guard
- 2nd Congressional District, Virginia Mounted Guard
- 3rd Congressional District, Virginia Mounted Guard
- 4th Congressional District, Virginia Mounted Guard
- 5th Congressional District, Virginia Mounted Guard
- 8th Congressional District, Virginia Mounted Guard
- 9th Congressional District, Virginia Mounted Guard
- 11th Congressional District, Virginia Mounted Patrol Guard
- 12th Congressional District, Virginia Mounted Guard
- 13th Congressional District, Virginia Mounted Guard
- Fairview Rifle Guards (from Wayne, WV. Became part of Co. K, 8th VA Cav)
- Harness' Independent Company, Virginia Cavalry
- McFarlane's Virginia Cavalry Company
- Moorman's Virginia Cavalry Company (Greenbrier)
- Wilson's Virginia Cavalry Company
- Young's Virginia Cavalry Company (converted Howitzers, Marine Artillery)

=== Irregular units ===
- 18th Virginia Cavalry (Partisan Rangers)
- 24th Battalion Virginia Cavalry Partisan Rangers (Scott's)
- 27th Battalion Virginia Cavalry Partisan Rangers
- 35th Battalion Virginia Cavalry (White's Battalion/White's Comanches)
- 37th Battalion Virginia Cavalry Partisan Rangers (37th Cavalry Battalion, Dunn's)
- 43rd Battalion Virginia Cavalry Partisan Rangers (Mosby's Rangers)
- 44th Battalion Virginia Cavalry Partisan Rangers (Hounshells)
- 62nd Virginia Mounted Infantry (1st Partisan Rangers, Imboden's)
- Smith's Battalion Virginia Cavalry
- Swann's Battalion Virginia Cavalry (Carpenter's)
- Major Counts' Battalion Virginia Cavalry
- Baldwin's Squadron, Partisan Rangers Company
- Captain McNeill's Virginia Partisan Ranger Company
- Captain Thurmond's Virginia Partisan Rangers Company

== Artillery units (PACS) ==
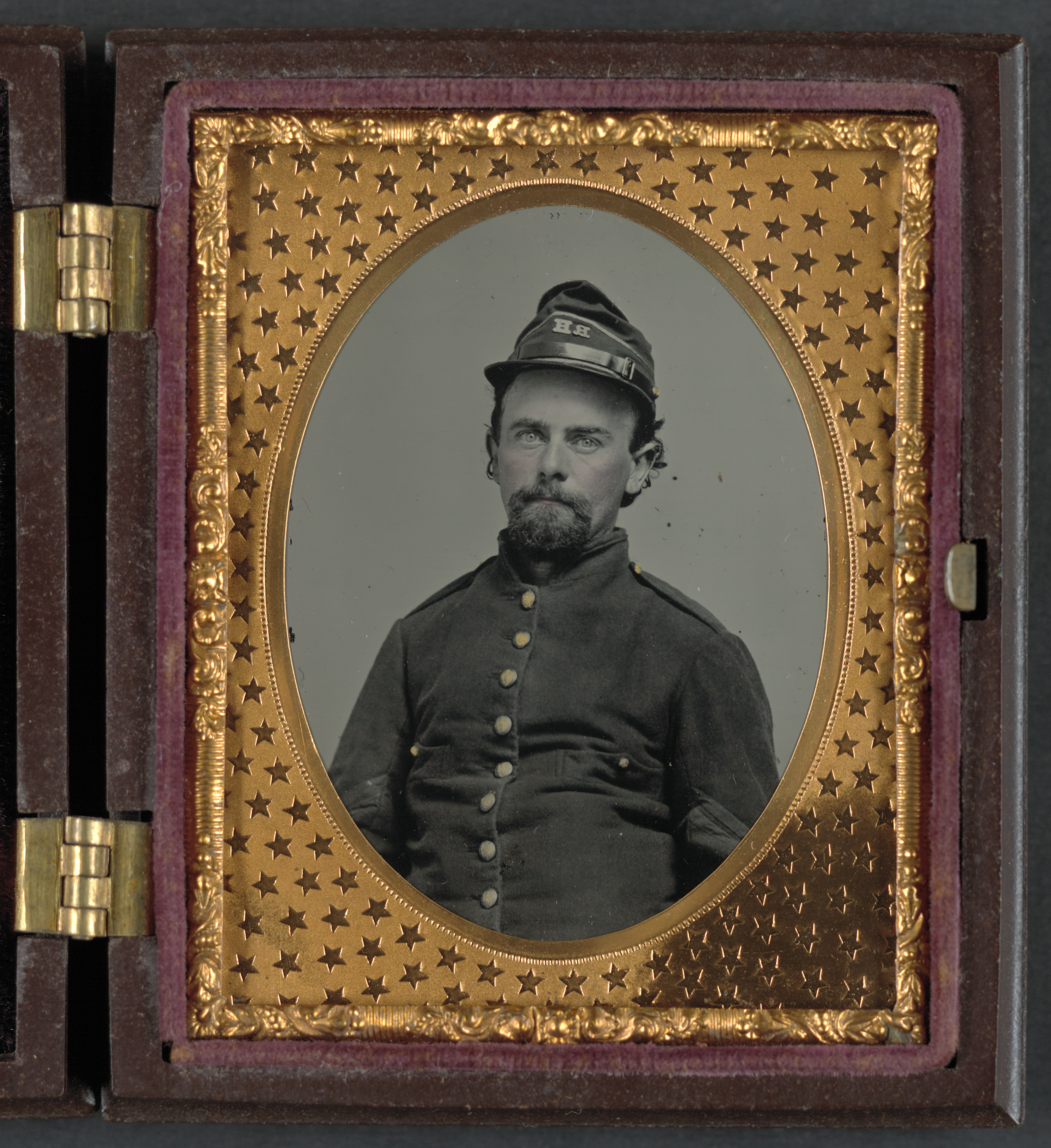
Unidentified soldier in Confederate uniform and Richmond Howitzers artillery unit hat

Private Alexander T. Harris of Richmond "Parker" Virginia Light Artillery Battery

=== Artillery regiments ===
- 1st Regiment, Virginia Artillery
- 1st Regiment, Virginia Light Artillery (Pendleton's)
- 2nd Regiment, Virginia Artillery
- 5th Regiment, Virginia Artillery

=== Artillery battalions ===
- 1st Battalion (Hardaway's, Moseley's)
- 4th Battalion, Virginia Heavy Artillery
- 7th Battalion, Virginia Heavy Artillery
- 10th Battalion, Virginia Heavy Artillery (Allen's)
- 12th Battalion, Virginia Light Artillery
- 13th Battalion, Virginia Light Artillery
- 16th Battalion, Virginia Heavy Artillery
- 18th Battalion, Virginia Light Artillery
- 18th Battalion, Virginia Heavy Artillery
- 19th Battalion, Virginia Heavy Artillery (Atkinson's)
- 20th Battalion, Virginia Heavy Artillery
- 38th Battalion, Virginia Light Artillery (Read's)

=== Light artillery batteries ===
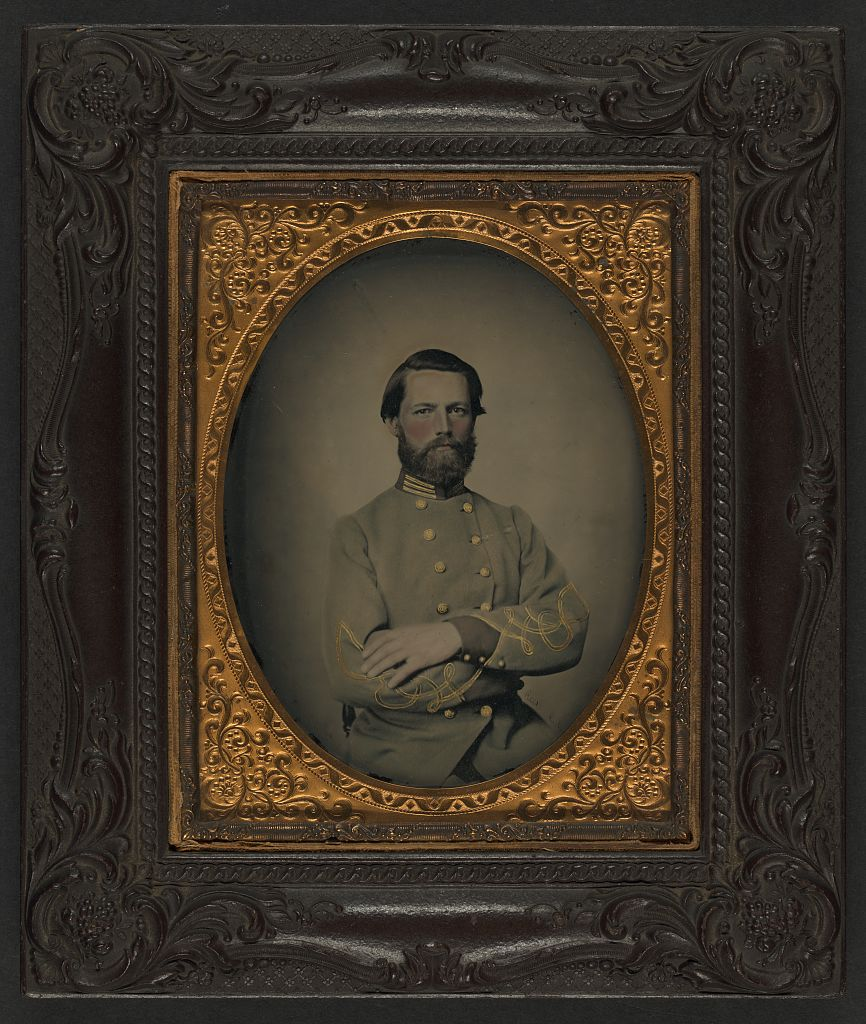
Captain William W. Cosby of H Company, 2nd Virginia Light Artillery Regiment

- 1st Rockbridge Artillery (Pendleton's, Poague's)
- 2nd Rockbridge Artillery (McDowell Guard)
- 2nd Richmond Battery
- Albemarle Artillery
- Gauley Artillery (Adams`s)
- Alleghany Rough Artillery (Carpenter's)
- Amherst Artillery (Light) (Kirkpatrick's)
- Barr's Battery (Light) (Levi's)
- Bedford Artillery (Light)
- Branch Field Artillery (Light)
- Bryan's Artillery
- Caroline Artillery (Light)
- Chapman's Artillery (Light)
- Charlottesville Artillery (Light)
- Chesapeake Artillery
- Crenshaw Battery
- Danville Artillery (Light)
- Dixie Artillery (Light)
- Everett Artillery
- Fluvanna Artillery (Light)
- Fredericksburg Artillery
- Giles Artillery (McComas')
- Hanover Artillery (Light)
- Henrico Artillery
- Jackson Artillery (Light)
- James City Artillery
- Lee Battery
- Letcher Artillery (Light)
- Long Island Artillery (Light)
- Loudoun Artillery (Light)
- Lowry's Artillery (Light)
- Magruder Artillery (Light)
- Manchester Artillery (Light)
- Matthews Artillery (Light)
- Middlesex Artillery (Fleet's)
- Nelson Artillery (Light)
- New Market Artillery (Light)
- Norfolk Light Artillery Blues
- Nottoway Artillery (Light)
- Orange Artillery (Light)
- Page's Battery
- Parker’s Battery (Light)
- Pittsylvania Artillery (Light)
- Portsmouth Artillery (Grimes')
- Powhatan Artillery
- Purcell Artillery (Light) (Pegram's)
- Richmond Flying Artillery (Light)
- Richmond Howitzers
- Salem Flying Artillery
- Saltville Artillery
- Southside Artillery
- Staunton Artillery (Light)
- Staunton Hill Artillery
- Surry Artillery (Light)
- Turner Artillery (Light)
- United Artillery
- Winchester Artillery (Cutshaw's)
- Wise Artillery (Light)

Stafford Light Artillery

- VMI Artillery Section

=== Heavy artillery batteries ===
Captain James H.M. Neblett of Neblett's-Coleman's Virginia Heavy Artillery Battery

- Bayley's Battery (Virginia Heavy Artillery)
- Bethel Artillery (Coffin's)
- Botetourt Artillery (Bowyer's)
- Campbell Battery (Patterson's)
- Coleman's Battery (Neblett's)
- Halifax Artillery (Wright's)
- Johnston Artillery (Epes')
- Kyle's Battery
- Lunenberg Artillery (Allen's)
- Marion Artillery (Wilkinson's)
- Pamunkey Artillery (A.J. Jones')

=== Horse artillery ===
- 1st Stuart's Horse Artillery (Pelham's)
- 2nd Stuart's Light Horse Artillery
- Callahan's Horse Artillery
- Chew's Battery
- Moorman's/Shoemaker's Battery
- Petersburg Artillery

== Virginia State units ==
=== Virginia State Line ===
- 1st Regiment, Virginia State Line
- 2nd Regiment, Virginia State Line
- 3rd Regiment, Virginia State Line
- 4th Regiment, Virginia State Line
- 5th Regiment, Virginia State Line

=== Virginia militia regiments ===
- 1st Regiment Militia (Amelia Co.)
- 2nd Regiment Militia (Accomack Co.)
- 3rd Regiment Militia (Orange Co.)
- 4th Regiment Militia (Ohio Co. WV)
- 5th Regiment Militia (Culpeper Co.)
- 6th Regiment Militia (Essex Co.)
- 7th Regiment Militia (Norfolk Co.)
- 8th Regiment Militia (Rockbridge Co.)
- 9th Regiment Militia (King & Queen Co.)
- 12th Regiment Militia (Bedford Co.)
- 13th Regiment Militia (Shenandoah Co.)
- 14th Regiment Militia (Hardy Co. WV)
- 15th Regiment Militia (Sussex Co.)
- 16th Regiment Militia (Spotsylvania Co.)
- 17th Regiment Militia (Campbell Co.)
- 18th Regiment Militia (Patrick Co.)
- 19th Regiment Militia (City of Richmond)
- 20th Regiment Militia (Princess Anne Co.)
- 21st Regiment Militia (Gloucester Co.)
- 22nd Regiment Militia (Mecklenburg Co.)
- 23rd Regiment Militia (Chesterfield Co.)
- 24th Regiment Militia (Buckingham Co.)
- 25th Regiment Militia (King George Co.)
- 26th Regiment Militia (Charlotte Co.)
- 27th Regiment Militia (Northampton Co.)
- 28th Regiment Militia (Nelson Co.)
- 29th Regiment Militia (Isle of Wight Co.)
- 30th Regiment Militia (Caroline Co.)
- 31st Regiment Militia (Frederick Co.)
- 32nd Regiment Militia (Augusta Co.)
- 33rd Regiment Militia (Henrico Co.)
- 34th Regiment Militia (Culpeper Co.)
- 35th Regiment Militia (Wythe Co.)
- 36th Regiment Militia (Prince William Co.)
- 37th Regiment Militia (Northumberland Co.)
- 38th Regiment Militia (Goochland Co.)
- 39th Regiment Militia (City of Petersburg)
- 40th Regiment Militia (Louisa Co.)
- 41st Regiment Militia (Richmond Co.)
- 42nd Regiment Militia (Pittsylvania Co.)
- 43rd Regiment Militia (Franklin Co.)
- 44th Regiment Militia (Fauquier Co.)
- 46th Regiment Militia (Pendleton Co. WV)
- 47th Regiment Militia (Albemarle Co.)
- 49th Regiment Militia (Nottoway Co.)
- 50th Regiment Militia (Greensville Co.)
- 51st Regiment Militia (Frederick Co.)
- 52nd Regiment Militia (New Kent Co. and Charles City Co.)
- 53rd Regiment Militia (Campbell Co.)
- 54th Regiment Militia (City of Norfolk)
- 55th Regiment Militia (Jefferson Co. WV)
- 56th Regiment Militia (Loudoun Co.)
- 57th Regiment Militia (Loudoun Co.)
- 58th Regiment Militia (eastern Rockingham Co.)
- 59th Regiment Militia (Nansemond Co.)
- 60th Regiment Militia (Fairfax Co.)
- 61st Regiment Militia (Mathews Co.)
- 62nd Regiment Militia (Prince George Co.)
- 63rd Regiment Militia (Prince Edward Co.)
- 64th Regiment Militia (Henry Co.)
- 65th Regiment Militia (Southampton Co.)
- 66th Regiment Militia (Brunswick Co.)
- 67th Regiment Militia (Berkeley Co. WV)
- 68th Regiment Militia (James City Co. and part of York Co.)
- 70th Regiment Militia (Washington Co.)
- 71st Regiment Militia (Surry Co.)
- 72nd Regiment Militia (Russell Co.)
- 73rd Regiment Militia (Lunenburg Co.)
- 74th Regiment Militia (Hanover Co.)
- 75th Regiment Militia (Montgomery Co.)
- 76th Regiment Militia (Monongalia Co.)
- 77th Regiment Militia (Hampshire Co. WV)
- 78th Regiment Militia (Grayson Co.)
- 79th Regiment Militia (Greenbrier Co.)
- 79th Regiment Militia (Greenbrier Co.)
- 80th Regiment Militia (Kanawha Co.)
- 81st Regiment Militia (Bath Co.)
- 82nd Regiment Militia (Madison Co.)
- 83rd Regiment Militia (Dinwiddie Co.)
- 84th Regiment Militia (Halifax Co.)
- 85th Regiment Militia (Fauquier Co.)
- 86th Regiment Militia (Giles Co.)
- 87th Regiment Militia (King William Co.)
- 88th Regiment Militia (Albemarle Co.)
- 89th Regiment Militia (Morgan Co.)
- 90th Regiment Militia (Amherst Co.)
- 91st Regiment Militia (Bedford Co.)
- 92nd Regiment Militia (Lancaster Co.)
- 93rd Regiment Militia (Augusta Co.)
- 94th Regiment Militia (Lee Co.)
- 95th Regiment Militia (Norfolk Co.)
- 97th Regiment Militia (Page Co.)
- 98th Regiment Militia (Mecklenburg Co.)
- 99th Regiment Militia (Accomack Co.)
- 100th Regiment Militia (Buckingham Co.)
- 101st Regiment Militia (Pittsylvania Co.)
- 102nd Regiment Militia (Powhatan Co.)
- 103rd Regiment Militia (Brooke Co.)
- 104th Regiment Militia (Preston Co.)
- 105th Regiment Militia (Washington Co.)
- 107th Regiment Militia (Randolph Co., WV)
- 108th Regiment Militia (Monroe Co.)
- 109th Regiment Militia (Middlesex Co.)
- 110th Regiment Militia (Franklin Co.)
- 111th Regiment Militia (Westmoreland Co.)
- 112th Regiment Militia (Tazewell Co.)
- 113th Regiment Militia (Wood Co., WV)
- 114th Regiment Militia (Hampshire Co., WV)
- 115th Regiment Militia (Elizabeth City Co., Warwick Co., and part of York Co.)
- 116th Regiment Militia (western Rockingham Co.)
- 117th Regiment Militia (Campbell Co.)
- 118th Regiment Militia (Marion Co., WV)
- 119th Regiment Militia (Harrison Co., WV)
- 120th Regiment Militia (Cabell Co., WV)
- 121st Regiment Militia (Botetourt Co.)
- 122nd Regiment Militia (Clarke Co.)
- 123rd Regiment Militia (Tyler Co., WV)
- 124th Regiment Militia (Scott Co.)
- 125th Regiment Militia (Lewis Co., WV)
- 126th Regiment Militia (Nicholas Co., WV)
- 127th Regiment Militia (Pocahontas Co., WV)
- 129th Regiment Militia (Nicholas Co. and Logan Co., WV)
- 130th Regiment Militia (Floyd Co.)
- 131st Regiment Militia (City of Lynchburg)
- 132nd Regiment Militia (Loudoun Co.)
- 133rd Regiment Militia (Upshur Co., WV)
- 134th Regiment Militia (Marshall Co., WV)
- 135th Regiment Militia (Greenbrier Co., WV)
- 136th Regiment Militia (Shenandoah Co.)
- 137th Regiment Militia (Harrison Co., WV)
- 138th Regiment Militia (Harrison Co., WV)
- 139th Regiment Militia (Barbour Co., WV)
- 140th Regiment Militia (Monongalia Co., WV)
- 141st Regiment Militia (Jackson Co., WV)
- 142nd Regiment Militia (Fayette Co., WV)
- 143rd Regiment Militia (Smyth Co.)
- 144th Regiment Militia (Rockbridge Co.)
- 145th Regiment Militia (Rockingham Co.)
- 146th Regiment Militia (Shenandoah Co.)
- 147th Regiment Militia (Marion Co., WV)
- 148th Regiment Militia (Preston Co., WV)
- 149th Regiment Militia (Warren Co.)
- 150th Regiment Militia (Braxton Co., WV)
- 151st Regiment Militia (Mercer Co., WV)
- 152nd Regiment Militia (Carroll Co.)
- 153rd Regiment Militia (Kanawha Co., WV)
- 154th Regiment Militia (Wetzel Co., WV)
- 155th Regiment Militia (Greene Co.)
- 156th Regiment Militia (Patrick Co.)
- 157th Regiment Militia (Roanoke Co.)
- 158th Regiment Militia (Pulaski Co.)
- 159th Regiment Militia (Lee Co.)
- 160th Regiment Militia (Augusta Co.)
- 161st Regiment Militia (Ohio Co., WV)
- 162nd Regiment Militia (Highland Co.)
- 163rd Regiment Militia (Hancock Co., WV)
- 164th Regiment Militia (Washington Co.)
- 165th Regiment Militia (Gilmer Co., WV)
- 166th Regiment Militia (Monroe Co.)
- 167th Regiment Militia (Wayne Co., WV)
- 168th Regiment Militia (Pittsylvania Co.)
- 169th Regiment Militia (Barbour Co., WV)
- 170th Regiment Militia (Ritchie Co., WV)
- 171st Regiment Militia (Wirt Co., WV)
- 172nd Regiment Militia (Halifax Co.)
- 173rd Regiment Militia (Preston Co., WV)
- 174th Regiment Militia (Appomattox Co.)
- 175th Regiment Militia (Alexandria Co.)
- 176th Regiment Militia (Marion Co., WV)
- 177th Regiment Militia (Russell Co.)
- 178th Regiment Militia (Monongalia Co., WV)
- 179th Regiment Militia (City of Richmond)
- 180th Regiment Militia (Doddridge Co., WV)
- 181st Regiment Militia (Putnum Co., WV)
- 182nd Regiment Militia (Buchanan Co., WV)
- 183rd Regiment Militia (Wythe Co.)
- 184th Regiment Militia (Raleigh Co., WV)
- 185th Regiment Militia (Scott Co.)
- 186th Regiment Militia (Calhoun Co., WV)
- 187th Regiment Militia (Boone Co., WV)
- 188th Regiment Militia (Tucker Co., WV)
- 189th Regiment Militia (Craig Co.)
- 190th Regiment Militia (Wyoming Co., WV)
- 191st Regiment Militia (Pleasants Co., WV)
- 192nd Regiment Militia (Lewis Co., WV)
- 194th Regiment Militia (Wise Co.)
- 195th Regiment Militia (Franklin Co.)
- 198th Regiment Militia (Bland Co. and Clay Co.)
- 199th Regiment Militia (Webster Co., WV)

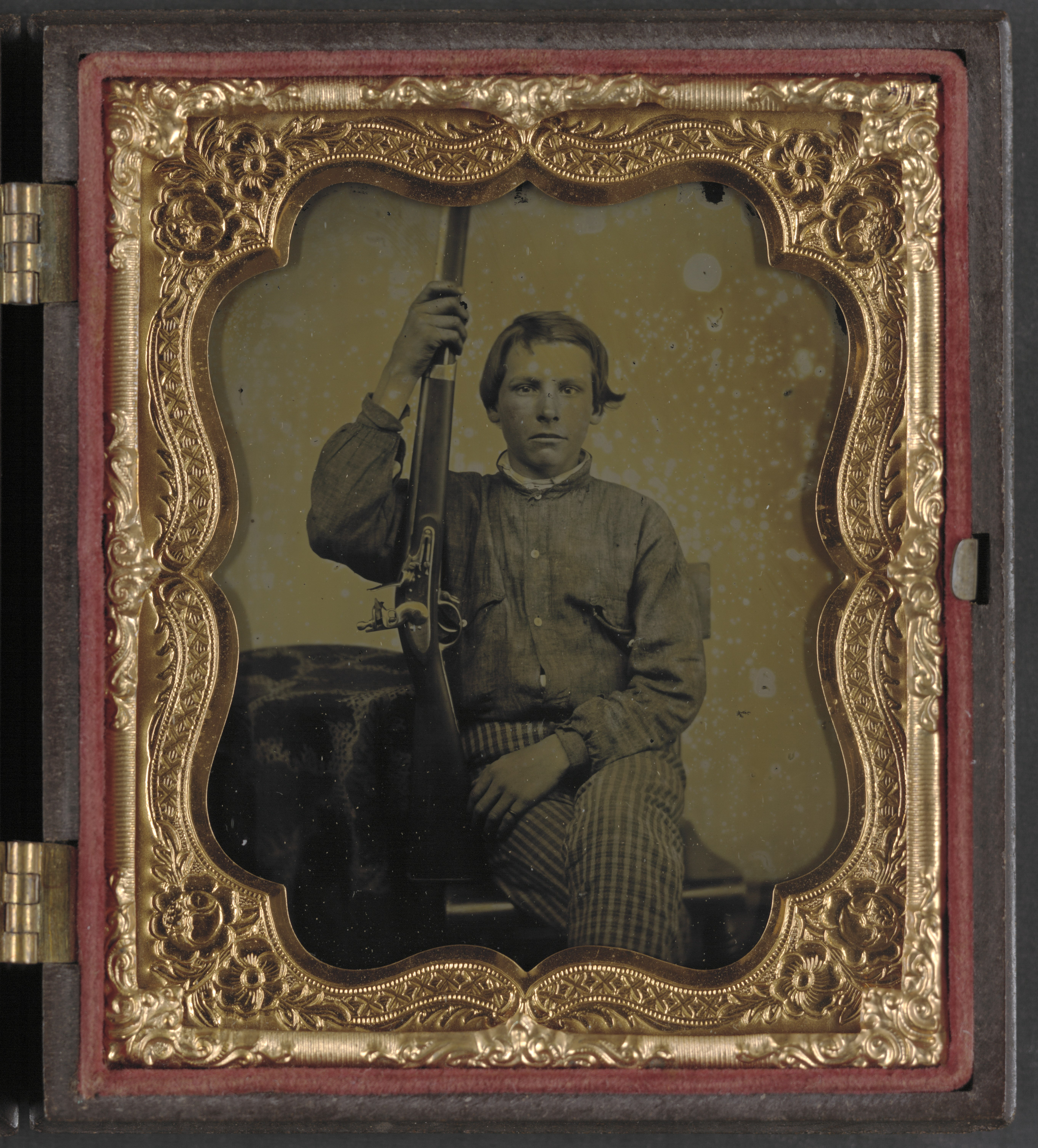
Private William H. Presgraves of Company K, 97th Militia Virginia Infantry Regiment

=== Virginia local defense battalions ===
- 1st Battalion, Virginia Cavalry, Local Defense (Browne's)
- 1st Battalion, Virginia Infantry, Local Defense (Ordnance Battalion)
- 2nd Battalion, Virginia Infantry, Local Defense (Waller's/Quartermaster Battalion)
- 3rd Battalion, Virginia Infantry, Local Defense (Departmental)
- 4th Battalion, Virginia Infantry, Local Defense (Naval/Navy Department Battalion)
- 5th Battalion, Virginia Infantry, Local Defense (Arsenal Battalion)
- 6th Battalion, Virginia Infantry, Local Defense (Tredegar Battalion)
- 7th Battalion, Virginia Infantry, Local Defense (1st Nitre Battalion)

== Union Virginia units ==
- 1st Regiment Loyal Eastern Virginia Volunteers
- 1st Regiment, Virginia Infantry
- 4th Virginia Infantry (later became 4th West Virginia Infantry)
- 5th Virginia Infantry (later became 5th West Virginia Infantry)
- 16th Regiment, Virginia Infantry
- 167th Regiment of Virginia Militia (originally a Confederate unit. Changed to Union after creation of the Restored Government of Virginia. Later became the 167th Regiment of West Virginia Militia)
- Dameron's Independent Company, Virginia Volunteers
- Loudoun Rangers
- 1st West Virginia Volunteer Infantry Regiment (3 Month)
- 1st West Virginia Volunteer Infantry Regiment (3 Year)
- 1st West Virginia Veteran Volunteer Infantry Regiment
- 2nd West Virginia Volunteer Infantry Regiment
- 2nd West Virginia Veteran Volunteer Infantry Regiment
- 3rd West Virginia Volunteer Infantry Regiment
- 4th West Virginia Volunteer Infantry Regiment
- 5th West Virginia Volunteer Infantry Regiment
- 6th West Virginia Volunteer Infantry Regiment
- 7th West Virginia Volunteer Infantry Regiment
- 8th West Virginia Volunteer Infantry Regiment
- 9th West Virginia Volunteer Infantry Regiment
- 10th West Virginia Volunteer Infantry Regiment
- 11th West Virginia Volunteer Infantry Regiment
- 12th West Virginia Volunteer Infantry Regiment
- 13th West Virginia Volunteer Infantry Regiment
- 14th West Virginia Volunteer Infantry Regiment
- 15th West Virginia Volunteer Infantry Regiment
- 16th West Virginia Volunteer Infantry Regiment
- 17th West Virginia Volunteer Infantry Regiment
- Independent Battalion West Virginia Infantry
- 1st Independent Company Loyal Virginians
- 1st West Virginia Volunteer Cavalry Regiment
- 2nd West Virginia Volunteer Cavalry Regiment
- 3rd West Virginia Volunteer Cavalry Regiment
- 4th West Virginia Volunteer Cavalry Regiment
- 5th West Virginia Volunteer Cavalry Regiment
- 6th West Virginia Volunteer Cavalry Regiment
- 7th West Virginia Volunteer Cavalry Regiment
- Battery "A" West Virginia Light Artillery
- Battery "B" West Virginia Light Artillery
- Battery "C" West Virginia Light Artillery
- Battery "D" West Virginia Light Artillery
- Battery "E" West Virginia Light Artillery
- Battery "F" West Virginia Light Artillery
- Battery "G" West Virginia Light Artillery
- Battery "H" West Virginia Light Artillery

== See also ==
- Virginia in the Civil War
- List of American Civil War regiments by state
- Southern Unionists
- United States Colored Troops
