= Battery F, 1st West Virginia Light Artillery Regiment =

- Flag of West Virginia
- Active: April 8, 1863 to September 14, 1864
- Country: United States
- Allegiance: Union
- Branch: Artillery
- Engagements: Battle of Kernstown II

The Battery F, 1st West Virginia Light Artillery Regiment was an artillery battery that served in the Union Army during the American Civil War.

== Service ==
Battery F was originally raised as Company C, 6th West Virginia Infantry Regiment and converted to an independent battery on April 8, 1863.

Battery F was absorbed by Battery A, 1st West Virginia Light Artillery Regiment September 14, 1864.

The 1st West Virginia Light Artillery Regiment lost 33 men, killed and died of wounds; 131 men, died of disease, accident or in prison; total deaths, 164 men. (all 8 batteries)

Captains were Thomas A. Maulsby first George W. Graham 2nd

[Source: Regimental Losses in the American Civil War, 1861–1865, by William F. Fox]

== See also ==
- West Virginia Units in the Civil War
- West Virginia in the Civil War
