= 1st Independent Company Loyal Virginians =

- Flag of West Virginia
- Active: June 30, 1864, to December 1, 1865
- Country: United States
- Allegiance: Union
- Branch: Infantry
- Engagements: None

The 1st Independent Company Loyal Virginians was an infantry company that served in the Union Army during the American Civil War.

== Service ==
The 1st Independent Company was organized at Cobb's Island in Virginia on June 30, 1864.

The company was mustered out on December 1, 1865.

== Commanders ==
Robert Hamilton was elected Captain by the company along with Adam Garrison as First Lieutenant and Thomas McQuown as Second Lieutenant.

== See also ==
- List of Union Virginia Civil War units
- West Virginia Units in the Civil War
- West Virginia in the Civil War
