= Ewald Over =

German-American entrepreneur and American Civil War veteran (1835–1912)

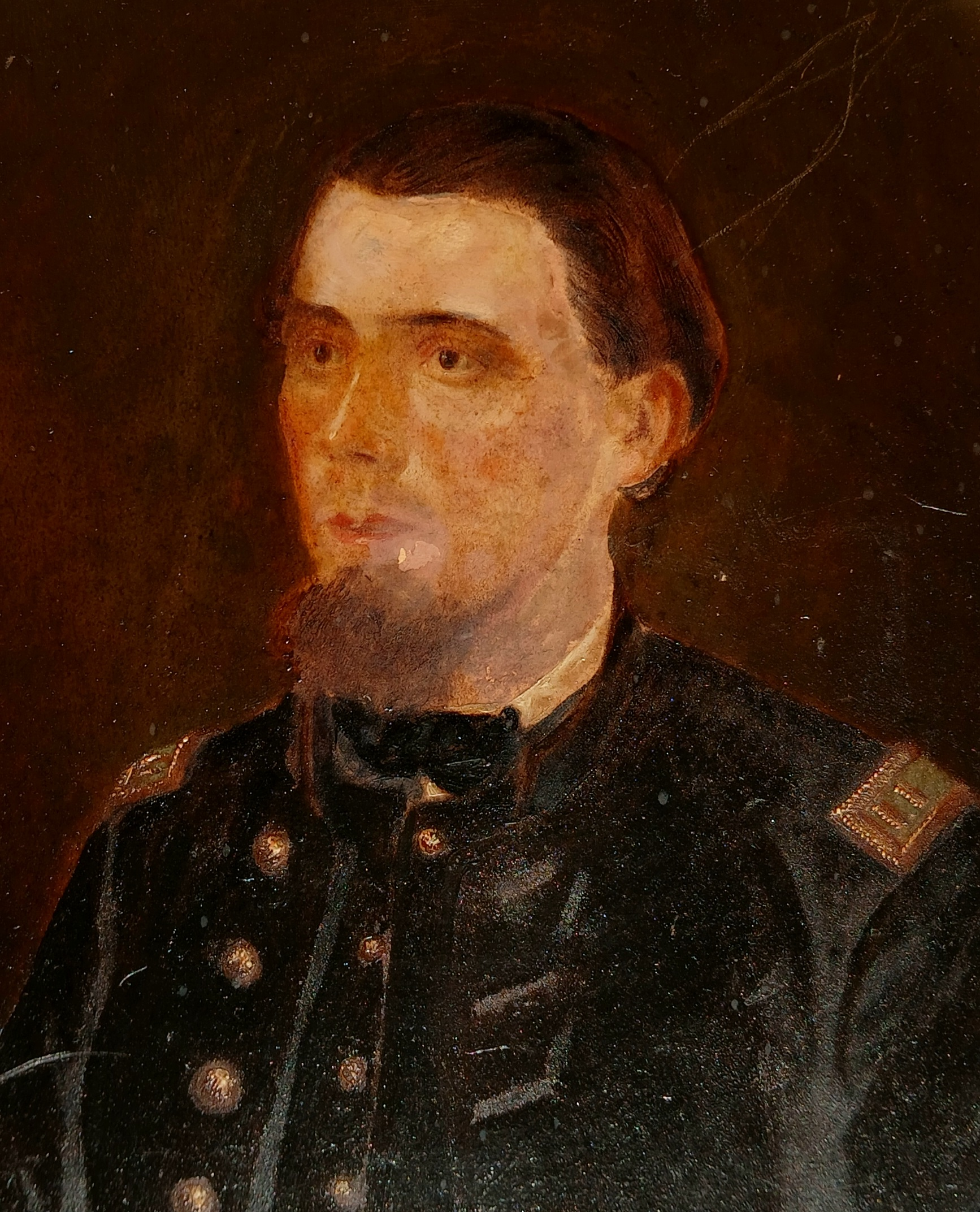
- Born: July 25, 1835; Renscheid, Rhenish Prussia, Germany
- Died: April 10, 1912 (aged 76); Indianapolis, Indiana, U.S.
- Military career
- Branch: Army
- Service years: 1821-1824
- Rank: Captain
- Units: P. Company, 6th West Virginia Volunteer Infantry

Signature
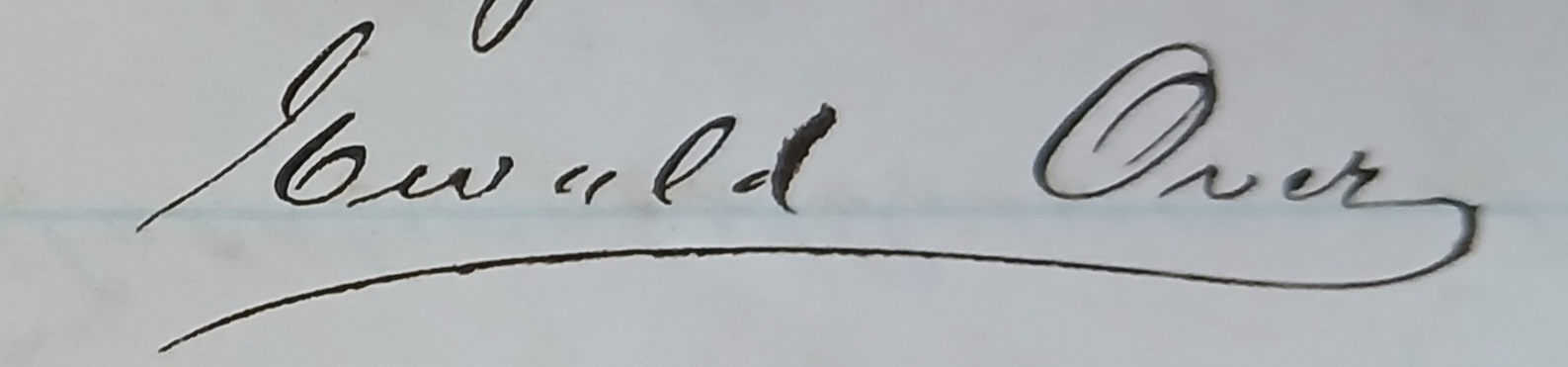

Ewald Over was a German-American entrepreneur and veteran of the American Civil War. He was born to his father, William Over, and his mother, Caroline Boecke, on July 25, 1835, in Remscheid, Rhenish Prussia, Germany, near the city of Siegen, where he received his education. At about the age of 15, he immigrated to America with his mother and father. They settled in the town of Wheeling, West Virginia. There, he became a bookkeeper and a clerk at a local hardware house. He married Anna Heinzelman on August 12, 1853. During the American Civil War, Ewald Over served as Captain of P. Company in the 6th West Virginia Volunteer Infantry. After the war, in 1865, Over moved to Indianapolis, Indiana and became an entrepreneur, his most successful business being Victor Foundry. Over's father died in 1877, as well as his first wife in 1894. Over remarried on September 11, 1895, and his son, William Ewald Over was born in 1899. He was a member of many organizations including the Grand Army of the Republic, and the Indianapolis Board of Trade. He died on April 10, 1912.

== The American Civil War ==
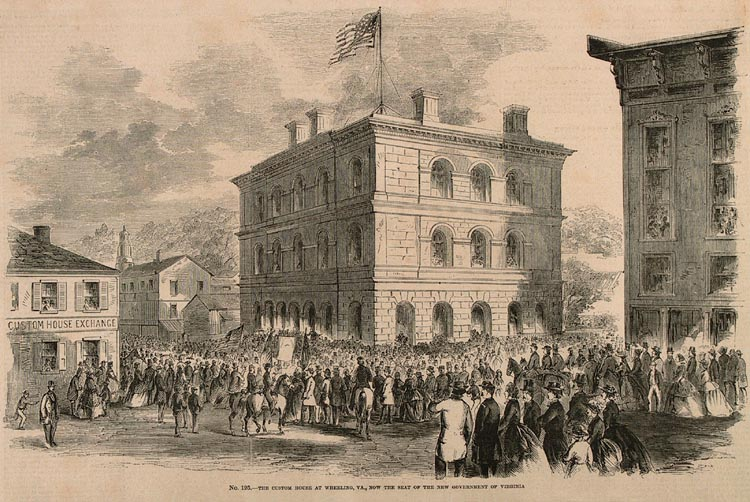
The Wheeling Athenaeum (1861)

After the outbreak of the Civil War on September 23, 1861, Ewald Over joined the Union Army at Camp Carlile, Wheeling. Upon entering, he became Captain of P. Company, 6th West Virginia Volunteer Infantry, and mustered into service on December 26, 1861. Over remained the position of Captain of the company up until becoming military commander of Wheeling on March 4, 1862, and spent some time guarding the Confederate prisoners held in the local makeshift prison, which was previously a theater called "The Athenaeum" which served as a feeder to the larger prison, Camp Chase. Over recalled the conditions of the military prisoners in an article by the Wheeling Daily Intelligencer as "...a sight to behold." He then again became commander of P. Company on April 3, 1862, and escorted a confederate prisoner to Washington D.C. Once again, he became the military commander of Wheeling on June 4, 1862. It was during this time that Over injured his leg from having it give way while atop a table, carrying ammunition. After partially recovering from his injury, on August 31, 1862, Over became Provost-Marshal of Clarksburg, and remained in this position until November 20, 1862, when he then became Assistant Adjutant General of Colonel Wilkinson's brigade. He later returned to his post as military commander at Wheeling, on January 10, 1864. Shortly after returning to Wheeling, on January 26, 1864, Over encountered Confederate spy Loreta Janeta Velazquez, who persuaded him to grant her transportation on the Baltimore and Ohio Railroad. While the documents she presented are unclear, it is known that she carried an order from General Louis H. Pelouze authorizing her travel. During the following months, Ewald Over helped advocate for the establishment of a local army hospital in Wheeling, and after its establishment, on April 15, 1864, he appointed Dr. John Kirker, the acting assistant surgeon, to take charge of the hospital. The following summer, on June 9, 1864, at 3 o'clock in the afternoon, under the orders of Major General David Hunter, Captain Ewald Over, along with a small cadre soldiers from his company, arrested Lewis Baker and O.S. Long, the editors of a Confederate sympathizing newspaper called the "Wheeling Daily Register". Over remained in his position until November 1, 1864, when he then became Assistant Military Commander of Wheeling before mustering out of the war on December 29, 1864, upon which he received criticism by the "Wheeling Daily Register" in their newspaper.

== Career as an entrepreneur and life in Indianapolis ==
Victor Foundry & Machine Works on 240-246 Pennsylvania Street (1889)
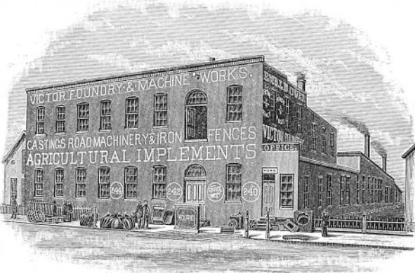
- Victor Foundry & Machine Works on 240-246 Pennsylvania Street (1889)
- Location: 240-246 South Pennsylvania Street, Indianapolis, Indiana
- Products: Road machinery, agricultural implements, general castings, etc.
- Buildings: A two-story brick building (100 x 40 feet) with a basement, housing a machine shop and a finishing shop, as well as a separate 100 x 50-foot foundry with a 40 x 50-foot second level.

In 1865, Ewald Over moved to Indianapolis, Indiana along with his wife. He became an entrepreneur and went into the wholesale grocery business on South Meridian Street. He became a senior member of the firm, "Over & Krag" but this was short lived, and Over went out of the business in 1871. He then pursued various business ventures, including the establishment of E. Over & Co., a wholesale business located on 82-84 South Meridian Street, which Ewald Over co-founded along with his partner, Henry Schnull. Their enterprise sold various products including hoop, bar, and sheet iron, as well as window glass, Wheeling Nails, circular saws, and many other items. Over also ventured into the importing and dealing of china, glassware, and queensware in a business named Over & Raynor on 58 South Meridian Street. Ewald Over eventually became the owner of the Victor Foundry & Machine Works in 1877. The foundry and Machine Works specialized in sash weights, and produced various products including road machinery, agricultural implements, and other general castings. It also manufactured Ewald Over's own patented fence posts, water filters, sewer inlets, spring washers, and soil pulverisers. It mainly supplied commodities to customers in Indiana, Kentucky, Illinois, and Ohio, but also to buyers across the

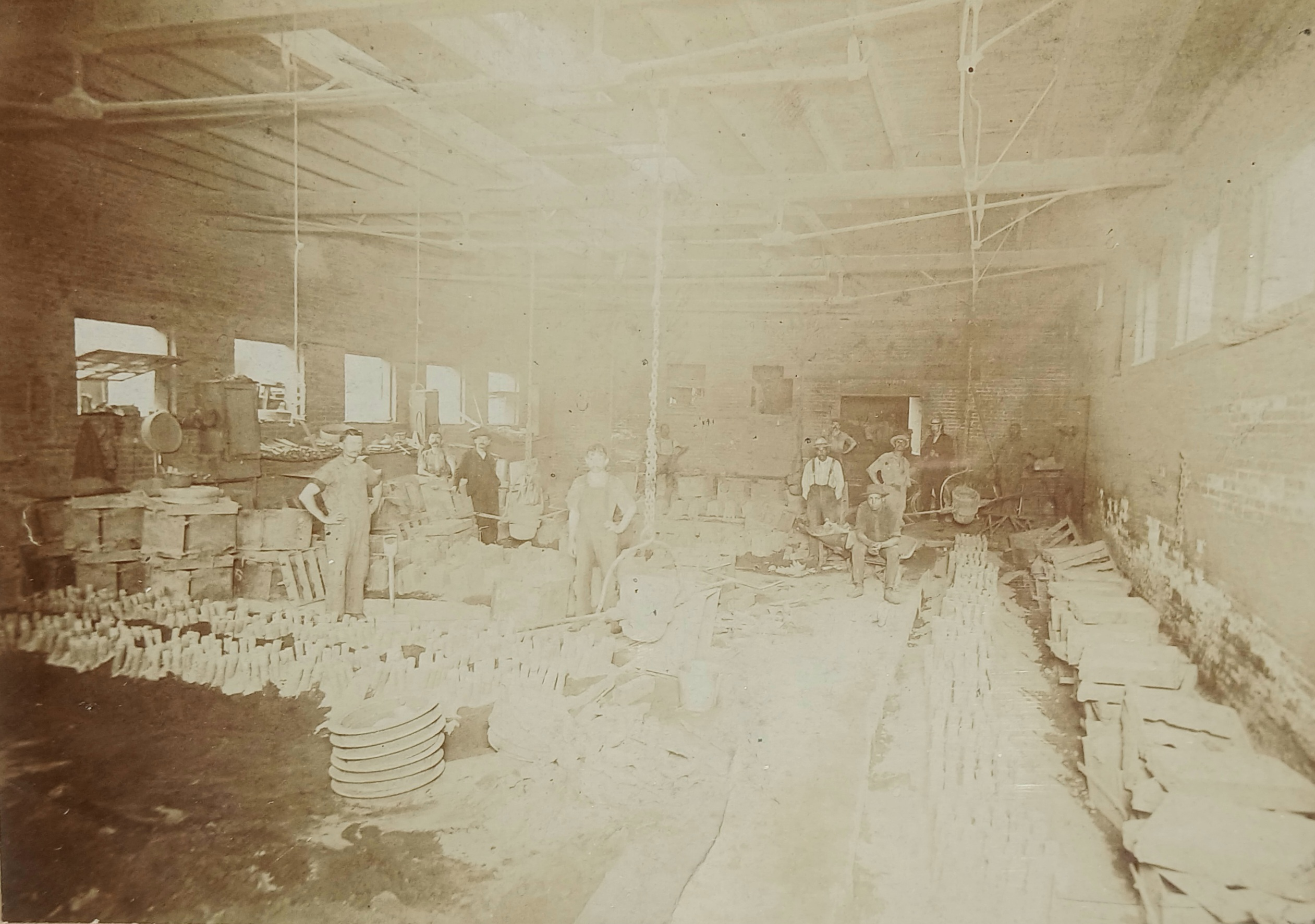
Victor Foundry sash weight sector at 7:00 am (1890)

nation, as well as in Canada, Australia, and England. Notably, the foundry supplied 100 tons of sash weights to the Hume-Mansur Building, and 60 tons to the Majestic Building. Following the death of his father in 1877, Ewald Over purchased a plot at Crown Hill Cemetery, as well as an estate monument to bury him in, and after the death of his wife on August 18, 1894, she was buried there as well. Ewald Over remarried on September 11, 1895, to

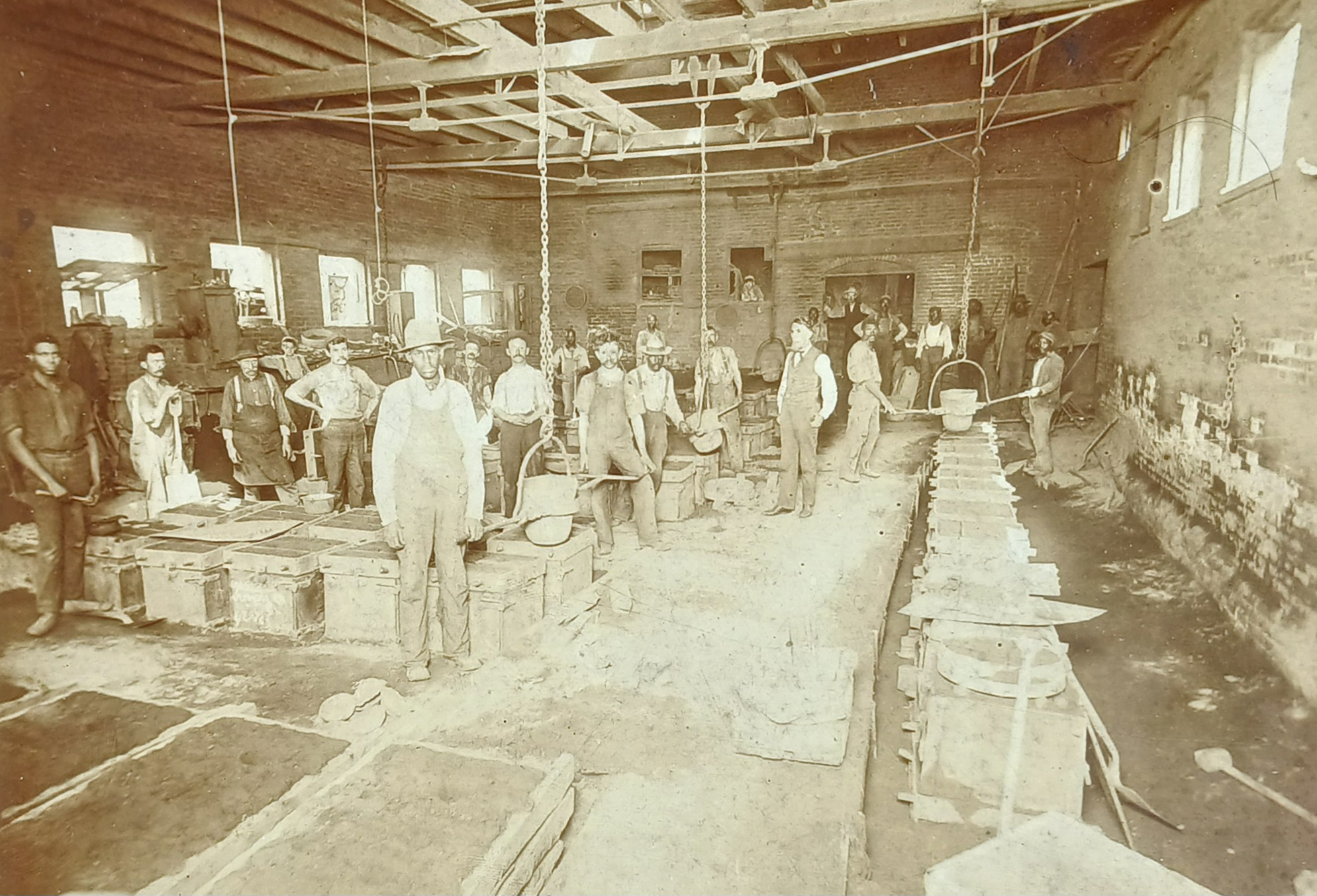
Victor Foundry sash weight sector at 4:00 pm (1890)

Elizabeth Ginsler, and they had one son, William Ewald Over, in 1899. The Victor Foundry & Machine Works suffered a fire of unknown origin on August 20, 1895, that burned most of the buildings on the property, which were constructed entirely from wood, except for the roofs, which were made from sheet metal, although the main brick building was able to survive the fire mostly unscathed, and insurance for the property partially covered the damages. Ultimately, the foundry property was sold some time later to make way for a railroad, and the foundry relocated to 921-923 Biddle Street, also having been renamed the Ewald Over Foundry. Ewald Over was an early member of the Old Choral Union, as well as the George H. Thomas Post, and the Grand Army of the Republic. He was a charter member of the Indianapolis Board of Trade, Commercial Club, and of the Rooks Chess Club where he became a state champion. He was also an important part of building the Second English Lutheran Church in Indianapolis.

== Death ==
Ewald Over died in 1912 after a two weeks illness due to hardening of the arteries, and he is now buried at Crown Hill Cemetery. After his death, the ownership of the Ewald Over Foundry was transferred to his wife, Elizabeth Over, while his son served as the superintendent.
