= Gauley Artillery =

Confederate States army unit

Gauley Artillery Adams`s Battery
- Flag of Virginia
- Active: June 22, 1861 to August, 1862
- Country: Confederate States of America
- Allegiance: Virginia
- Branch: Confederate States Army
- Type: Artillery battery
- Engagements: American Civil War: Battle of Fort Donelson

Commanders
- Notable commanders: Cpt. Stephen Adams

The Gauley Artillery, also known as Adams`s Battery, was a unit of the Confederate States Army that operated in western Virginia and Tennessee during the early years of the American Civil War.

It was organized by Cpt. Stephen Adams, who was the commonwealth attorney for the counties of Raleigh and Fayette. The men were recruited from the 184th Regiment of Virginia Militia and the company strength was 125 men. It was mustered into Confederate service on June 22, 1861. They were sent to White Sulphur Springs and assigned to artillery service. They were supplied with 4 artillery pieces, three 6-pounder smooth bore and one 10-pounder, which had been locally made. It was 2 months before enough horses were found to compose the teams for the unit. During this time an outbreak of measles was infecting the area.

The battery was assigned to the command of Brig. Gen. John B. Floyd, and placed on Cotton Hill, overlooking Gauley Bridge. In January 1862 they were assigned to the command of Col. John McCausland and transferred west to Fort Donelson in Tennessee. At the surrender of the fort to Union forces on Feb. 16, 1862, the battery was imprisoned at Camp Douglas, and later exchanged.

Cpt. Adams, who had not been at Fort Donelson at that time, had recruited more men for the battery, which was reorganized on August 24, 1862, but on Sept. 1 they were incorporated into the 30th Virginia Sharpshooters Battalion as Co. A., effectively ending the independent battery.

== See also ==
- List of Virginia Civil War units
