= 15th West Virginia Infantry Regiment =

- Flag of West Virginia
- Active: August 1862 to June 14, 1865
- Country: United States
- Allegiance: Union
- Branch: Infantry
- Engagements: Battle of Cloyd's Mountain; Battle of Lynchburg; Battle of Snicker's Ferry; Battle of Opequon (Third Winchester); Battle of Fisher's Hill; Battle of Cedar Creek; Siege of Petersburg; Appomattox Court House

The 15th West Virginia Infantry Regiment was an infantry regiment that served in the Union Army during the American Civil War.

== Service ==
The 15th West Virginia Infantry Regiment was organized at Wheeling in western Virginia between August and October 1862, and was mustered out on June 14, 1865.

== Casualties ==
The 15th West Virginia Infantry Regiment suffered 3 officers and 50 enlisted men killed in battle or died from wounds, and 1 officer and 99 enlisted men dead from disease for a total of 153 fatalities.

== Commanders ==
- Colonel Maxwell McCaslin, September 6, 1862 - September 7, 1864
- Colonel Milton Wells

== See also ==
- West Virginia Units in the Civil War
- West Virginia in the Civil War
