= Battery B, 1st West Virginia Light Artillery Regiment =

- Flag of West Virginia
- Active: October 1, 1861 to August 1, 1865
- Country: United States
- Allegiance: Union
- Branch: Artillery
- Engagements: Battle of Kernstown I First Battle of Rappahannock Station; Battle of Droop Mountain; Battle of Piedmont; Battle of Lynchburg; Battle of Cool Spring; Ashby Gap; Battle of Kernstown II

Battery B, 1st West Virginia Light Artillery Regiment was an artillery battery that served in the Union Army during the American Civil War.

== Service ==
Battery B was organized at Ceredo in western Virginia on October 1, 1861.

Battery B was consolidated with Battery E, 1st West Virginia Light Artillery Regiment on December 31, 1864.

== Casualties ==
The 1st West Virginia Light Artillery Regiment lost 33 men, killed and died of wounds; 131 men, died of disease, accident or in prison; total deaths, 164 men. (all 8 batteries)

[Source: Regimental Losses in the American Civil War, 1861–1865, by William F. Fox]

== Commander ==
- Cpt Samuel Davey (October 1861 through March 1862)
- Cpt John V. Keeper (April 1, 1862 through December 31 1864)

== See also ==
- West Virginia Units in the Civil War
- West Virginia in the Civil War
