= Battery E, 1st West Virginia Light Artillery Regiment =

- Flag of West Virginia
- Active: September 18, 1862 to June 28, 1865
- Country: United States
- Allegiance: Union
- Branch: Artillery
- Engagements: Battle of Kernstown II; Battle of New Creek

The Battery E, 1st West Virginia Light Artillery Regiment was an artillery battery that served in the Union Army during the American Civil War.

== Service ==
Battery E was organized at Buckhannon in western Virginia on September 18, 1862 and absorbed Battery "B" West Virginia Light Artillery on December 31, 1864. The Battery was known as the "Upshur Battery" due to the predominance of men from Upshur County who enlisted in its ranks.

Battery E was mustered out on June 28, 1865.

== Casualties ==
The 1st West Virginia Light Artillery Regiment lost 33 men, killed and died of wounds; 131 men, died of disease, accident or in prison; total deaths, 164 men. (all 8 batteries)

[Source: Regimental Losses in the American Civil War, 1861–1865, by William F. Fox]

== Commander ==
Captain Alexander C. Moore

== See also ==
- West Virginia Units in the Civil War
- West Virginia in the Civil War
