= 17th West Virginia Infantry Regiment =

- Flag of West Virginia
- Active: 26 September 1864 to 30 June 1865
- Country: United States
- Allegiance: Union
- Branch: Infantry
- Engagements: None

The 17th West Virginia Infantry Regiment was an infantry regiment that served in the Union Army during the American Civil War.

== Service ==
The 17th West Virginia Infantry Regiment was organized at Wheeling, West Virginia, between 26 September 1864 and 25 February 1865.

After they were mustered, on September 27, they moved to Clarksburg, West Virginia, to perform garrison duty and guard the railroads until they were mustered out.

The regiment was mustered out on 30 June 1865.

== Casualties ==
The 17th West Virginia Infantry Regiment suffered one enlisted man killed or mortally wounded in battle and 24 enlisted men dead from disease for a total of 25 fatalities.

President Joseph Robinette Biden's great-grandfather, Pvt. George Hamilton Robinette, served in the Regiment in 1864 and 1865.

== See also ==
- West Virginia Units in the Civil War
- West Virginia in the Civil War
