= 10th West Virginia Infantry Regiment =

- Active: March 12, 1862 – August 9, 1865
- Disbanded: August 9, 1865
- Country: United States
- Allegiance: Union
- Branch: Infantry
- Size: Regiment
- Engagements: American Civil War: Battle of Droop Mountain; Second Battle of Kernstown; Third Battle of Winchester; Battle of Fisher's Hill; Battle of Cedar Creek; Siege of Petersburg

Commanders
- Brigadier General: Thomas M. Harris
- Colonel: Morgan A. Darnal

The 10th West Virginia Infantry Regiment was an infantry regiment that served in the Union Army during the American Civil War.

== Service ==
The 10th West Virginia Infantry Regiment was organized at Camp Pickens, Canaan, Glenville, Clarkesville, Sutton, Philippi, and Piedmont in western Virginia between March 12 and May 18, 1862. The regiment was mustered out on August 9, 1865.

== Casualties ==
The 10th West Virginia Infantry Regiment suffered 2 Officers and 93 enlisted men killed in battle or died from wounds, and 1 officer and 107 enlisted men dead from disease for a total of 207 fatalities.

== See also ==
- West Virginia Units in the Civil War
- West Virginia in the Civil War
