= Battery G, 1st West Virginia Light Artillery Regiment =

- Flag of West Virginia
- Active: May 26, 1863 to June 22, 1864
- Country: United States
- Allegiance: Union
- Branch: Artillery
- Engagements: Battle of Droop Mountain; Battle of Moorefield

Commanders
- Current commander: Captain Chatham T. Ewing

The Battery G, 1st West Virginia Light Artillery Regiment was an artillery battery that served in the Union Army during the American Civil War.

== Service ==
Battery G was originally raised as Company G, 2nd West Virginia Infantry Regiment and converted to an independent battery on May 26, 1863. The men were recruited in Pittsburgh. Originally named the "Plummer Guards" they offered their services to the Restored Government of Virginia in Wheeling instead of their home state, fearing that no more men would be accepted for Pennsylvania.

Battery G was mustered out on June 22, 1864.

== Casualties ==
The 1st West Virginia Light Artillery Regiment lost 33 men, killed and died of wounds; 131 men, died of disease, accident or in prison; total deaths, 164 men. (all 8 batteries)

[Source: Regimental Losses in the American Civil War, 1861–1865, by William F. Fox]

== Officers ==
The original officers of the company were Captain Chatham T. Ewing; 1st Lieutenant, Alfred Sickman; 2d Lieutenant, Jacob Huggins. Lieutenant Sickman was killed December 13, 1861, in the battle of Allegheny Mountains, and Howard Morton who did gallant service on the occasion was promoted to his place. Lieutenant Huggins resigned early in 1862, and Samuel J. Shearer, a brave and capable officer, succeeded him.

== See also ==
- West Virginia Units in the Civil War
- West Virginia in the Civil War
