= Battery D, 1st West Virginia Light Artillery Regiment =

Battery "D" West Virginia Light Artillery
- Flag of West Virginia
- Active: August 20, 1862 to June 27, 1865
- Country: United States
- Allegiance: Union
- Branch: Artillery
- Engagements: Battle of Winchester; Battle of New Market; Battle of Piedmont

Battery D, 1st West Virginia Light Artillery Regiment was an artillery battery that served in the Union Army during the American Civil War.

== Service ==
Battery D was organized at Wheeling in western Virginia on August 20, 1862.

Battery D was mustered out on June 27, 1865.

== Casualties ==
The 1st West Virginia Light Artillery Regiment lost 33 men, killed and died of wounds; 131 men, died of disease, accident or in prison; total deaths, 164 men. (all 8 batteries)

[Source: Regimental Losses in the American Civil War, 1861–1865, by William F. Fox]

== Commander ==
Captain John Carlin

== See also ==
- West Virginia Units in the Civil War
- West Virginia in the Civil War
