= Battery C, 1st West Virginia Light Artillery Regiment =

- Flag of West Virginia
- Active: January 25, 1862 to June 28, 1865
- Country: United States
- Allegiance: Union
- Branch: Artillery
- Engagements: Battle of Cross Keys; Battle of Cedar Mountain; Second Battle of Bull Run; Battle of Port Republic; First Battle of Rappahannock Station; Second Battle of Kernstown; Battle of Chancellorsville; Battle of Gettysburg; Battle of Fort Stevens; Battle of Moorefield

The Battery C, 1st West Virginia Light Artillery Regiment was an artillery battery that served in the Union Army during the American Civil War.

== Service ==
Battery C was organized at Wheeling in western Virginia between January 25, 1862 and March 30, 1862 by Frank Buell and Dennis O'Leary, officers from Co. B, 8th Ohio Infantry Regiment (3 months).

Battery C was mustered out on June 28, 1865. It had a total of 173 men, with 115 enlisting from Washington County, Ohio, and the rest from West Virginia and Culpeper County, Va.

The 1st West Virginia Light Artillery Regiment lost 33 men, killed and died of wounds; 131 men, died of disease, accident or in prison; total deaths, 164 men. West Virginia contributed 44% of the men in the regiment, Ohio, Pennsylvania and Maryland contributed 31% and a sizeable minority of 16% were European immigrants.

== Command Structure ==
OFFICERS Frank Buell 1st Captain (killed at Freeman's Ford, August 22, 1862)

            Dennis O'Leary  Sr. 1st. Lieut.
            Wallace Hill    Jr. 1st. Lieut. (promoted 2nd Captain, Sept. 1, 1862 vice to Buell)
            John G. Theis   Sr. 2nd. Lieut. (promoted Jr. 1st. Lieut. Sept. 1, 1862 vice to Hill)
            William W. Withrow Jr. 2nd Lieut.(promoted Sr. 2nd. Lieu. Sept. 1, 1862 vice to Theis)
            Henry M. Langley (promoted from orderly sergeant to Jr. 2nd. Lt., Sept. 1, 1862, vice
              Withlow)
            Wesley Miner (promoted to Jr. 2nd. Lieut., January 1, 1863, vice Withrow, resigned)

STAFF SERGEANTS

            F. G. Field   Appointed Sr. 2nd. Lieut.         1st. Sergeant
            Thomas Phelps                                    Q. M.

LINE SERGEANTS

            1. Owen O'Neil
            2. John B. Hagan  discharged  March 14, 1863
            3. Alexander H. Buckley
            4. Leonidas R. Miraben
            5. David Dow
            6. William Goldsmith
            7. Albert U. Moore  Appointed, vice to Hagan

CORPORALS

            1. Farrel Cusack
            2. William F. Minster
            3. William H. Ranger
            4. John Lehnhard
            5. Jeremiah A. Dooley
            6. James Wright
            7. John Meighan
            8. John W. Jacobs  Appointed Jr. 2d. Lieut
            9. Milton H. Laughlin
           10. George W. Stanley
           11. John N. Miner
           12. Lafayette Franks

BUGLERS

            Frank B. Brenan
            William Jenvey

ARTIFICER

            Samuel S. Patterson
            David Wagoner

CASUALTIES

           Braddock,  S.J. Killed July 2, 1863
           Bramhall,  Jos  Died March 4, 1863
           Eaton,     John Wounded Bull Run; died September 4, 1862
           Henning,   Henry Died September 13, 1862.
           Holden,    Chas. A Died November 10, 1862
           Hutchinson, Jos. T Died September 12, 1863
           Lacey,     Chas   Killed July 3, 1863
           Perry,     JNO   Died September 15, 1862
           Reynolds,  JNO   Wounded Cross Keys; discharged
           Rogers,    F. M. Died March 1, 1863
           Rogers,    M. C. Died March 7, 1863
           Steeber,   Adam   Died July 4, 1863
           Strong,    Samuel  Died August 23, 1863

== See also ==
- West Virginia Units in the Civil War
- West Virginia in the Civil War
