= 16th West Virginia Infantry Regiment =

- Flag of West Virginia
- Active: August 1862 to June 10, 1863
- Country: United States
- Allegiance: Union
- Branch: Infantry
- Role: Serving in the defenses of Washington D.C.
- Engagements: None

The 16th West Virginia Infantry Regiment was an infantry regiment that served in the Union Army during the American Civil War.

== Service ==
The 16th West Virginia Infantry Regiment was organized at Washington, D.C. between August and September 1862. It spent its entire service in the defenses of Washington, D.C., and was mustered out on June 10, 1863.

== Casualties ==
The 16th West Virginia Infantry Regiment suffered 7 enlisted men dead from disease for a total of 7 fatalities.

== Notable Commanders ==
- Colonel James T. Close
- Lieutenant Colonel Samuel W. Snider
- Bernard C. Armstrong

== See also ==
- West Virginia Units in the Civil War
- West Virginia in the Civil War
