= List of Union units from West Virginia in the American Civil War =

West Virginia, which seceded from Virginia to join the Union, provided the following units to the Union Army during the American Civil War. Units raised in the western counties prior to the creation of the state of West Virginia were often known as, "loyal Virginians," who formed the Restored government of Virginia in Wheeling, West Virginia in 1861, unanimously electing Francis H. Pierpont as the new state governor. The state produced the most highly decorated cavalry regiment of the Union Army (tied with the 47th Ohio as the most highly decorated single regiment), and was credited with 32,000 Union soldiers, including 10 Brigadier and Major Generals. The soldier count by the George Tyler Moore Center for the Study of the Civil War estimates West Virginia's to be around 20,000, and others at around 25,000, with an unknown number serving in the regiments of surrounding states. The remaining soldiers consisted of Pennsylvania and Ohio volunteers, and with re-enlistments credited as new soldiers.

Most regiments were recruited from the Northern, central and southwestern counties. Elements of two state cavalry regiments, one infantry regiment and an artillery company, almost 760 men, played a key role against Pickett's Charge in the Battle of Gettysburg, less than two weeks after the official admission of the territory into the Union as the 35th state. The 1st, 2nd and 3rd West Virginia Cavalry also played a large role in directly cutting off the Confederate retreat at Appomattox Station on April 8, 1865, and was present during General Robert E. Lee's surrender at Appomattox Court House to General Ulysses S. Grant the following day.

== Infantry units ==
- 1st West Virginia Volunteer Infantry Regiment
- 1st West Virginia Veteran Volunteer Infantry Regiment
- 2nd West Virginia Volunteer Infantry Regiment
- 2nd West Virginia Veteran Volunteer Infantry Regiment
- 3rd West Virginia Volunteer Infantry Regiment
- 4th West Virginia Volunteer Infantry Regiment
- 5th West Virginia Volunteer Infantry Regiment
- 6th West Virginia Volunteer Infantry Regiment
- 7th West Virginia Volunteer Infantry Regiment
- 8th West Virginia Volunteer Infantry Regiment
- 9th West Virginia Volunteer Infantry Regiment
- 10th West Virginia Volunteer Infantry Regiment
- 11th West Virginia Volunteer Infantry Regiment
- 12th West Virginia Volunteer Infantry Regiment
- 13th West Virginia Volunteer Infantry Regiment
- 14th West Virginia Volunteer Infantry Regiment
- 15th West Virginia Volunteer Infantry Regiment
- 16th West Virginia Volunteer Infantry Regiment
- 17th West Virginia Volunteer Infantry Regiment
- Independent Battalion West Virginia Infantry
- 1st Independent Company Loyal Virginians

== Cavalry units ==
- 1st West Virginia Volunteer Cavalry Regiment
- 2nd West Virginia Volunteer Cavalry Regiment
- 3rd West Virginia Volunteer Cavalry Regiment
- 4th West Virginia Volunteer Cavalry Regiment
- 5th West Virginia Volunteer Cavalry Regiment
- 6th West Virginia Volunteer Cavalry Regiment
- 7th West Virginia Volunteer Cavalry Regiment
- Blazer's Scouts

== Artillery units ==
- Battery "A" West Virginia Light Artillery
- Battery "B" West Virginia Light Artillery
- Battery "C" West Virginia Light Artillery
- Battery "D" West Virginia Light Artillery
- Battery "E" West Virginia Light Artillery
- Battery "F" West Virginia Light Artillery
- Battery "G" West Virginia Light Artillery
- Battery "H" West Virginia Light Artillery

== See also ==
- West Virginia in the Civil War
- List of West Virginia Civil War Confederate units
- Lists of American Civil War Regiments by State
- Southern Unionists
