= 13th West Virginia Infantry Regiment =

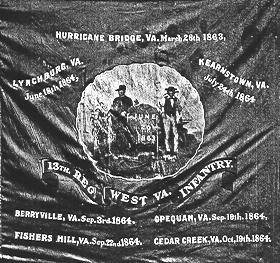
- Flag of the 13th West Virginia Volunteer Infantry
- Active: October, 1862 to June 22, 1865
- Country: United States
- Allegiance: Union
- Branch: Infantry
- Engagements: Battle of Hurricane Bridge; Battle of Lynchburg; Second Battle of Kernstown; Battle of Berryville; Battle of Opequon; Battle of Fisher's Hill; Battle of Cedar Creek

The 13th West Virginia Infantry Regiment was an infantry regiment that served in the Union Army during the American Civil War.

== Service ==
The 13th West Virginia Infantry Regiment was organized at Point Pleasant and Barboursville in western Virginia in October, 1862, and mustered out on June 22, 1865.

== Casualties ==
The 13th West Virginia Infantry Regiment suffered four Officers and 57 enlisted men killed in battle or died from wounds, and one officer and 108 enlisted men dead from disease for a total of 170 fatalities.

== See also ==
- West Virginia Units in the Civil War
- West Virginia in the Civil War
