= West Virginia Independent Infantry Battalion =

- Flag of West Virginia
- Active: October 1, 1862 to May 31, 1865
- Country: United States
- Allegiance: Union
- Branch: Infantry
- Engagements: None

The West Virginia Independent Infantry Battalion was an infantry battalion that served in the Union Army during the American Civil War.

== Service ==
The West Virginia Independent Infantry Battalion was organized at Wheeling in western Virginia between October 1, 1862, and January 9, 1863, and remained in garrison in Wheeling during its entire service. Company "B" of the battalion was mustered out on April 23, 1864. Company "A" of the battalion was mustered out on May 31, 1865.

== Casualties ==
The regiment suffered no casualties during their service

== Commanders ==
- Captain Perry G. West

== See also ==
- West Virginia Units in the Civil War
- West Virginia in the Civil War
