= Battery H, 1st West Virginia Light Artillery Regiment =

- Flag of West Virginia
- Active: January 4, 1864 to July 11, 1865
- Country: United States
- Allegiance: Union
- Branch: Artillery
- Engagements: Action at New Creek; Battle of Moorefield

The Battery H, 1st West Virginia Light Artillery Regiment was an artillery battery that served in the Union Army during the American Civil War.

== Service ==
Battery H was raised at Maryland Heights, Maryland on January 4, 1864.

The Battery initially conducted garrison and guard duty at Harper's Ferry, New Creek, Cumberland, Maryland and various points on the Baltimore & Ohio Railroad.

On August 4, 1864, the battery took part in an attack on New Creek, and would later take part in the Battle of Moorefield.

Battery H was mustered out on July 11, 1865.

== Casualties ==
The 1st West Virginia Light Artillery Regiment lost 33 men, killed and died of wounds; 131 men, died of disease, accident or in prison; total deaths, 164 men. (all 8 batteries)

[Source: Regimental Losses in the American Civil War, 1861–1865, by William F. Fox]

== Commander ==
Cpt James H. Holmes

== See also ==
- West Virginia Units in the Civil War
- West Virginia in the Civil War
