= Battery A, 1st West Virginia Light Artillery Regiment =

- Flag of West Virginia
- Active: June 28, 1861 to August 1, 1865
- Country: United States
- Allegiance: Union
- Branch: Artillery
- Engagements: Battle of Cheat Mountain; Battle of Greenbrier River; First Battle of Kernstown; Battle of Cedar Mountain

The Battery A, 1st West Virginia Light Artillery Regiment was an artillery battery that served in the Union Army during the American Civil War.

== Service (from Dyer's Compendium) ==
Organized at Wheeling, W. Va., and mustered in June 28, 1861. Attached to Army of Occupation, W. Va., to September, 1861. Cheat Mountain, District West Virginia, to January, 1862. Landers' Division, Army Potomac, to March, 1862. Shields' 2nd Division, Banks' 5th Army Corps, and Dept. of the Shenandoah, to May, 1862. Shields' Division, Dept. of the Rappahannock, to June, 1862. Slough's Command, Defenses of Washington, D.C., to February, 1863. Camp Barry, Defenses of Washington, 22nd Army Corps, to July, 1863. Maryland Heights, 2nd Division, Dept. of West Virginia, to December, 1863. 1st Brigade, 1st Division, Army of West Virginia, to April, 1864. Reserve Division, Harper's Ferry, W. Va., to October, 1864. 1st Separate Brigade Dept. of West Virginia, to July, 1865.

SERVICE.--At Elkwater until October, 1861. Operations on Cheat Mountain September 11–17. Action at Cheat Mountain September 11. Cheat Mountain Pass September 12. Point Mountain Turnpike and Elkwater September 12. Greenbrier River October 3–4. At Romney until January, 1862. Expedition to Blue's Gap January 6. Hanging Rock, Blue's Gap, January 7. At Paw Paw Tunnel until March. Advance on Winchester March 7–12. Battle of Kernstown, Winchester, March 22–23. Cedar Mountain March 25. Woodstock April 1. Eden burg April 2. Occupation of Mt. Jackson April 17. March to Fredericksburg May 12–22, and to Front Royal May 25–30. Front Royal May 30. Duty in the Defenses of Washington, D.C., until July, 1863. Ordered to Harper's Ferry, W. Va., thence to Charlestown. Expedition to near New Market November 15–18. Mt. Jackson November 16. Wells' demonstration up the Shenandoah Valley December 10–25. Duty at Harper's Ferry, Charlestown and Martinsburg until May, 1864. At Maryland Heights until October 17. Moved to Parkersburg October 17. Duty at Parkersburg, Charlestown and in the Kanawha Valley until July, 1865. Mustered out July 27, 1865.

== Casualties ==
The 1st West Virginia Light Artillery Regiment lost 33 men, killed and died of wounds; 131 men, died of disease, accident or in prison; total deaths, 164 men. (all 8 batteries)

[Source: Regimental Losses in the American Civil War, 1861–1865, by William F. Fox]

== Commander ==
Cpt John Jenks

== See also ==
- West Virginia Units in the Civil War
- West Virginia in the Civil War
