= 6th West Virginia Infantry Regiment =

- Flag of West Virginia
- Active: August 13, 1861 – July 21, 1865
- Country: United States
- Allegiance: Union
- Branch: Infantry
- Engagements: Jones-Imboden Raid

The 6th West Virginia Infantry Regiment was an infantry regiment that served in the Union Army during the American Civil War.

== Service ==
The 6th West Virginia Infantry Regiment was mustered into Federal service on August 13, 1861, at Grafton, Mannington, Cairo, Parkersburg and Wheeling, in western Virginia.

The regiment spent most of its service guarding the Baltimore & Ohio railroad line, fighting numerous small skirmishes against Confederate raiders and bushwhackers.

The regiment was mustered out of Federal service on June 10, 1865.

== Casualties ==
The 6th West Virginia Infantry Regiment suffered 8 enlisted men killed or fatally wounded in battle and 2 officers and 167 enlisted men dead from disease, for a total of 177 fatalities.

== See also ==
- West Virginia Units in the Civil War
- West Virginia in the Civil War
