= West Virginia in the American Civil War =

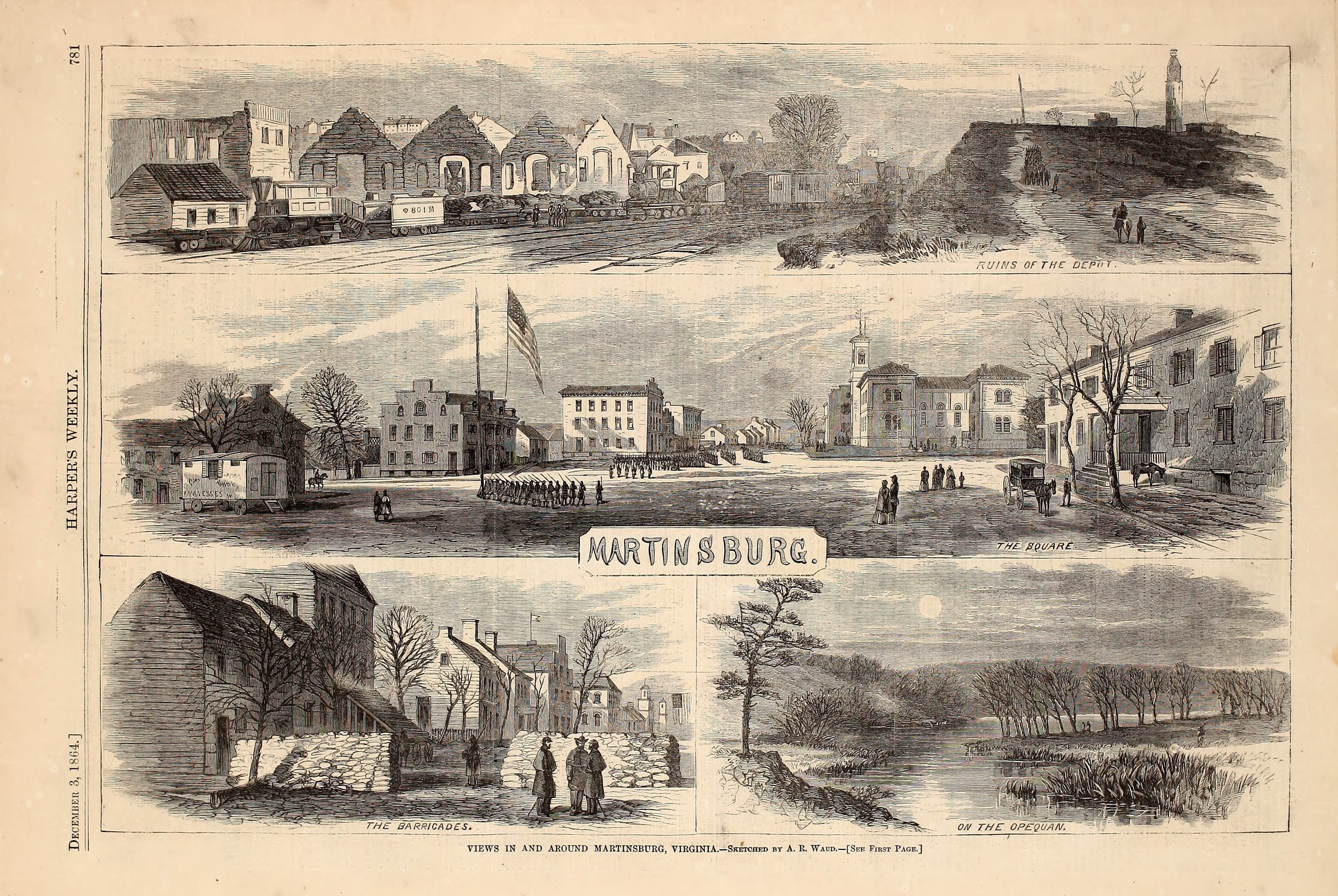
Views in and Around Martinsburg, Virginia by A. R. Waud (Harper's Weekly, December 3, 1864)

The U.S. state of West Virginia was formed out of western Virginia and added to the Union as a direct result of the American Civil War (see History of West Virginia), in which it became the only modern state to have declared its independence from the Confederacy. In the summer of 1861, Union troops, which included a number of newly formed Western Virginia regiments, under General George McClellan drove off Confederate troops under General Robert E. Lee at the Battle of Philippi in Barbour County. This essentially freed Unionists in the northwestern counties of Virginia to form a functioning government of their own as a result of the Wheeling Convention. Before the admission of West Virginia as a state, the government in Wheeling formally claimed jurisdiction over all of Virginia, although from its creation it was firmly committed to the formation of a separate state.

After Lee's departure, western Virginia continued to be a target of Confederate raids. Both the Confederate and state governments in Richmond refused to recognize the creation of the new state in 1863, and thus for the duration of the war the Confederacy regarded its own military offensives within West Virginia not as invasion but rather as an effort to liberate what it considered to be enemy-occupied territory administered by an illegitimate government in Wheeling. Nevertheless, due to its increasingly precarious military position and desperate shortage of resources, Confederate military actions in what it continued to regard as "western Virginia" focused less on reconquest as opposed to both on supplying the Confederate Army with provisions as well as attacking the vital Baltimore and Ohio Railroad that linked the northeast with the Midwest, as exemplified in the Jones-Imboden Raid. Guerrilla warfare also gripped the new state, especially in the Allegheny Mountain counties to the east, where loyalties were much more divided than in the solidly Unionist northwest part of the state. Despite this, the Confederacy was never able to seriously threaten the Unionists' overall control of West Virginia.

== History ==
=== Political events ===
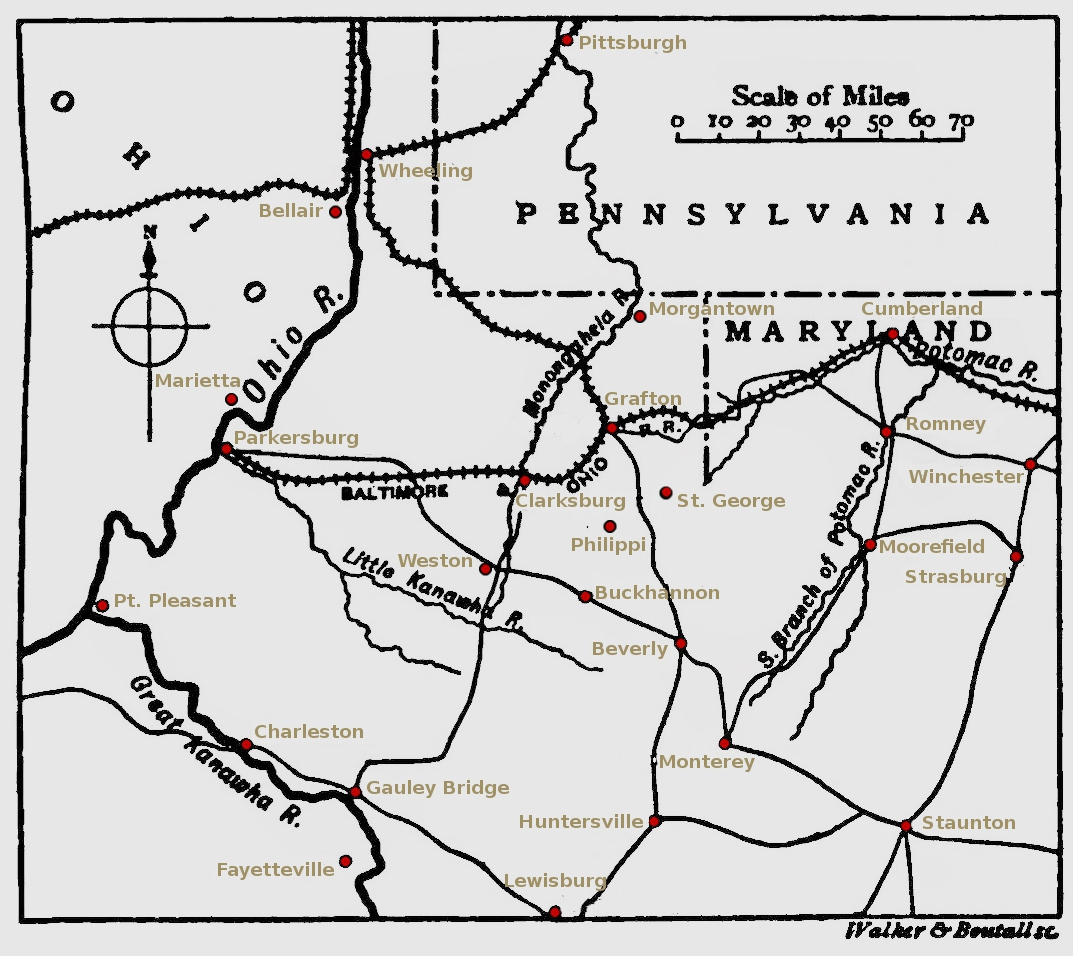
Map of western Virginia in 1861

On April 17, 1861, the Virginia state convention in Richmond declared secession from the union. There were 49 delegates representing the 50 counties that became West Virginia. On April 17 they voted 32 against the ordinance, 13 in favor, and 4 absent or abstained. The convention adjourned on May 1, to be reconvened in June. Most of the 49 delegates returned to Richmond in June and a majority signed the ordinance of secession. Of the 49 delegates 29 signed the ordinance.

On May 15, western Virginia Unionists convened the first session of the Wheeling Convention. Most of the 436 delegates were informally selected or self-appointed, over 1/3 were from the 4 counties of the northern panhandle. During the convention Gov. Dennison of Ohio requested that John Carlile and other Unionists meet with his Attorney General Christopher Wolcott in Bridgeport, OH. They were told if they would break off from Virginia that Ohio would send military force to protect them. The convention denounced secession and called for a more formal selection of delegates. However no official county elections for delegates were held, as most county officials were still supportive of the Richmond government.

Returns from the western counties were slow in arriving when Gov. Letcher announced Virginia's passage of the secession ordinance. Some published returns were conflicting and some were missing. Historian Richard O. Curry estimated an approximate vote on the secession ordinance from West Virginia's counties as 34,677 against and 19,121 in favor of secession, with 24 counties supporting the ordinance and 26 rejecting it.

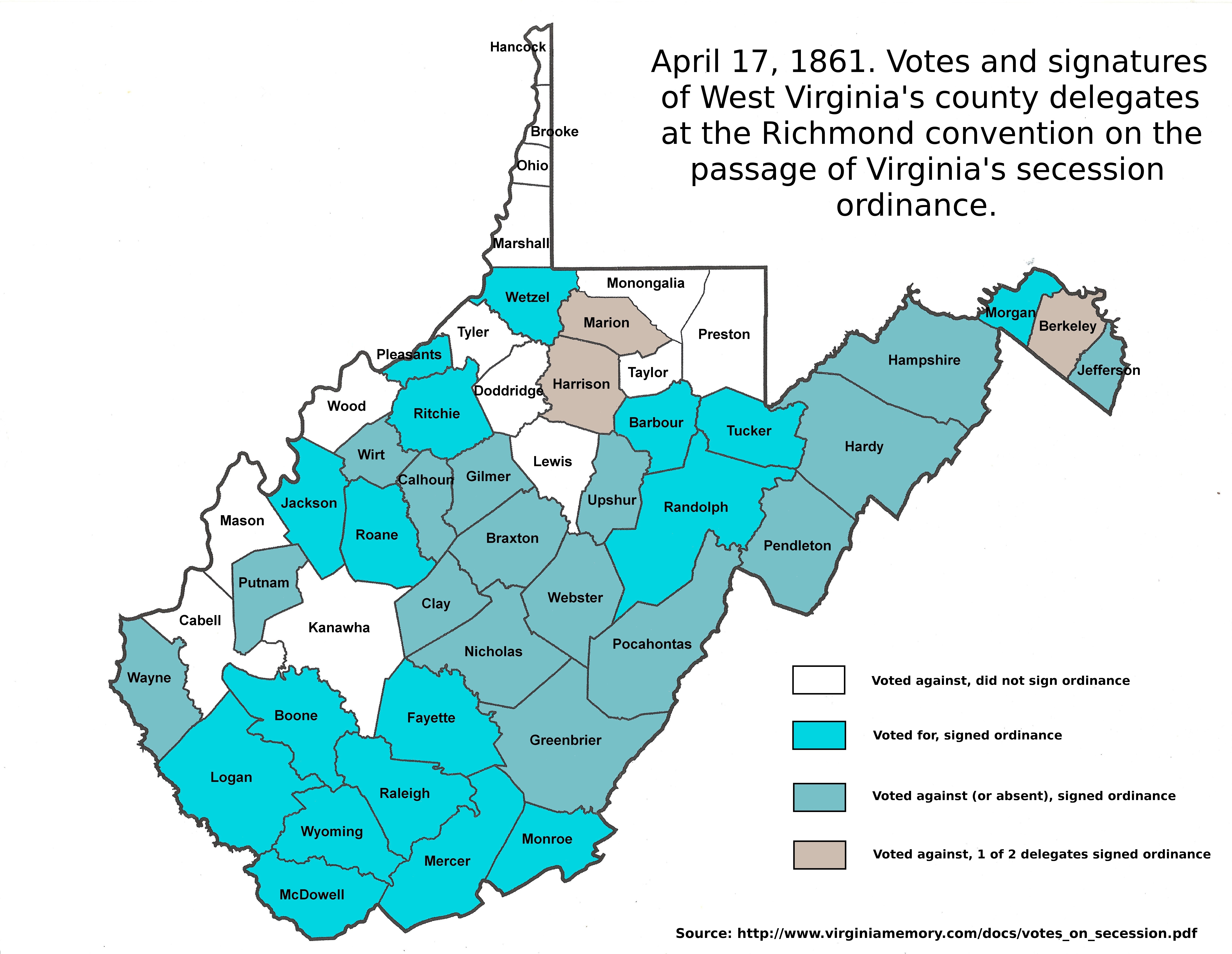
West Virginia delegate votes and signatures at the Richmond convention, April 17, 1861

Although most of West Virginia's delegates to the Richmond convention had opposed the secession ordinance, the initiation of war in the west prompted most of them to return to Richmond in June for the second meeting of the convention, at which time they signed the secession ordinance, 29 of the original 49 members signing.

With Virginia now part of the Confederacy, a convention of Unionists in Wheeling organized a rump government on June 11, with Francis H. Pierpont as governor and a legislature composed of elected state delegates and senators who had refused to serve in the Richmond government. This "Restored Government of Virginia" was officially recognized by the Lincoln administration. The members of this government and the Wheeling convention that organized it had not been elected by the people of West Virginia for this purpose, however, and faced much opposition in the region. Many of West Virginia's delegates and senators refused to join the Wheeling government and assumed their elected offices in Richmond.

The extent of control by the Wheeling government was limited to the counties of the northern panhandle and the counties along the line of the B&O railroad, and depended upon the presence of the Union army in garrisoning towns and patrolling turnpikes and roads. Historian Charles H. Ambler has said "There was no denying the fact that West Virginia was largely the creation of the Northern Panhandle and the counties along the Baltimore and Ohio railroad, which supplied her officers and funds for her public institutions." The construction of the B&O railroad in the 1850s connecting Baltimore to towns in northwestern Virginia resulted in the settlement of thousands of northerners and immigrants in towns located along the railroad. In Wheeling by 1860 two of three heads-of-households were not native Virginians, and in the town of Grafton, an important hub for the railroad, about half the adult males were Irish or other immigrants. While Grafton became a Unionist town, a short distance away secession flags flew from the courthouses of Barbour county in Philippi and Tucker county in St. George. On the Ohio river the town of Guyandotte in Cabell county raised the secession flag and began recruiting for the 8th Virginia Cavalry, while Mason County just to the north was heavily Unionist in sentiment.

The May 23rd county vote on the secession ordinance was no guarantee of Union support once the war started in the west. Berkeley County, which had voted 3 to 1 against the ordinance, gave twice the number of men to the Confederate army than to the Union. Similarly, the counties of Cabell, Wayne, Putnam and others in the southwest, while voting 3 or 4 to 1 against the ordinance, gave half or nearly half their available men to the Confederate army.

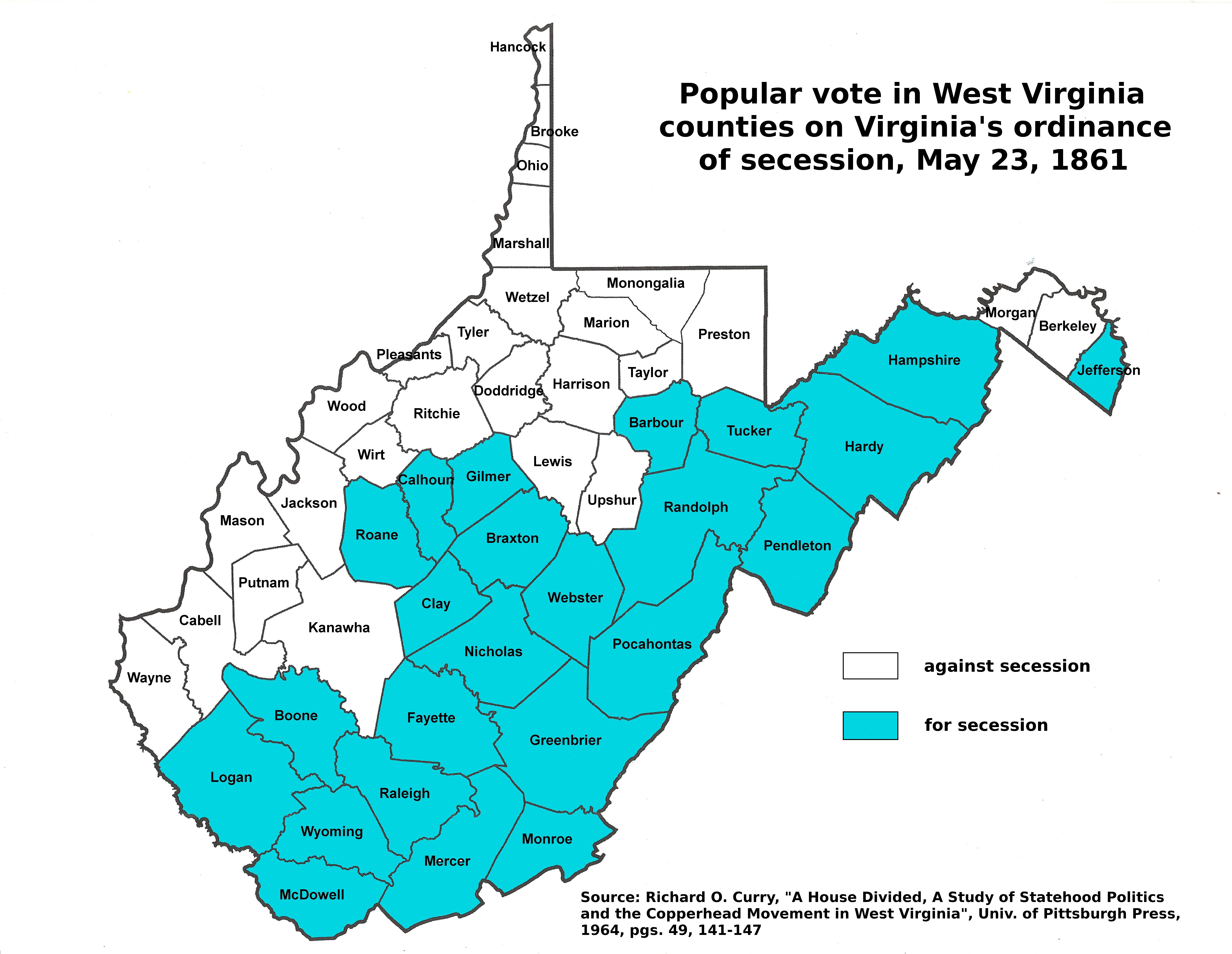
County voting on Virginia's secession May 23, 1861

Partisan rangers and guerrillas were active in much of the interior of western Virginia. The Richmond government still had nominal control over counties in the southeastern section of West Virginia, with neither side able to claim many interior counties where local government had been abandoned.

Recruitment was slow for both Union and Confederate forces. The Wheeling government leaned on Ohio and Pennsylvania for men to help fill the "Virginia" quotas required by the Federal government, and the Confederacy was effectively blocked from recruitment in the populous counties of the northwest by the Union army. When Gov. Letcher called out local militias for mustering most counties in the upper northwest refused to assemble, though many in the central and southern counties responded in varying degrees.

Some members of the Wheeling convention, such as John Carlile, had been demanding that western Virginia be organized as a new state and separated from Virginia. Others, such as Daniel Lamb, questioned the propriety of creating a new state and writing a constitution which included counties that could not or would not freely vote. Nevertheless, the 2nd Wheeling Convention approved a statehood ordinance on August 20, with a public vote to be held of Oct. 24, 1861. The Convention was not the same as the Reorganized Government, though there were some crossover members.

The statehood vote was 18,408 in favor and 781 against, with only 41 of the 50 counties included on the returns, six of which provided no votes at all. While the vote was successful in providing a referendum to offer Congress with the statehood bill, it was a failure in terms of sentiment in favor of statehood. With 79,515 voters enumerated by the 1860 census in the 50 counties the turnout was extremely low. As historian Otis K. Rice noted-"Although the Wheeling Intelligencer professed to see an "astonishing unanimity" of sentiment in the vote, in reality the returns reflected the deep division of feeling in western Virginia and intimidation on the part of supporters of the new state. Seventeen counties giving majorities for dismemberment had ratified the Virginia secession ordinance earlier in the year."

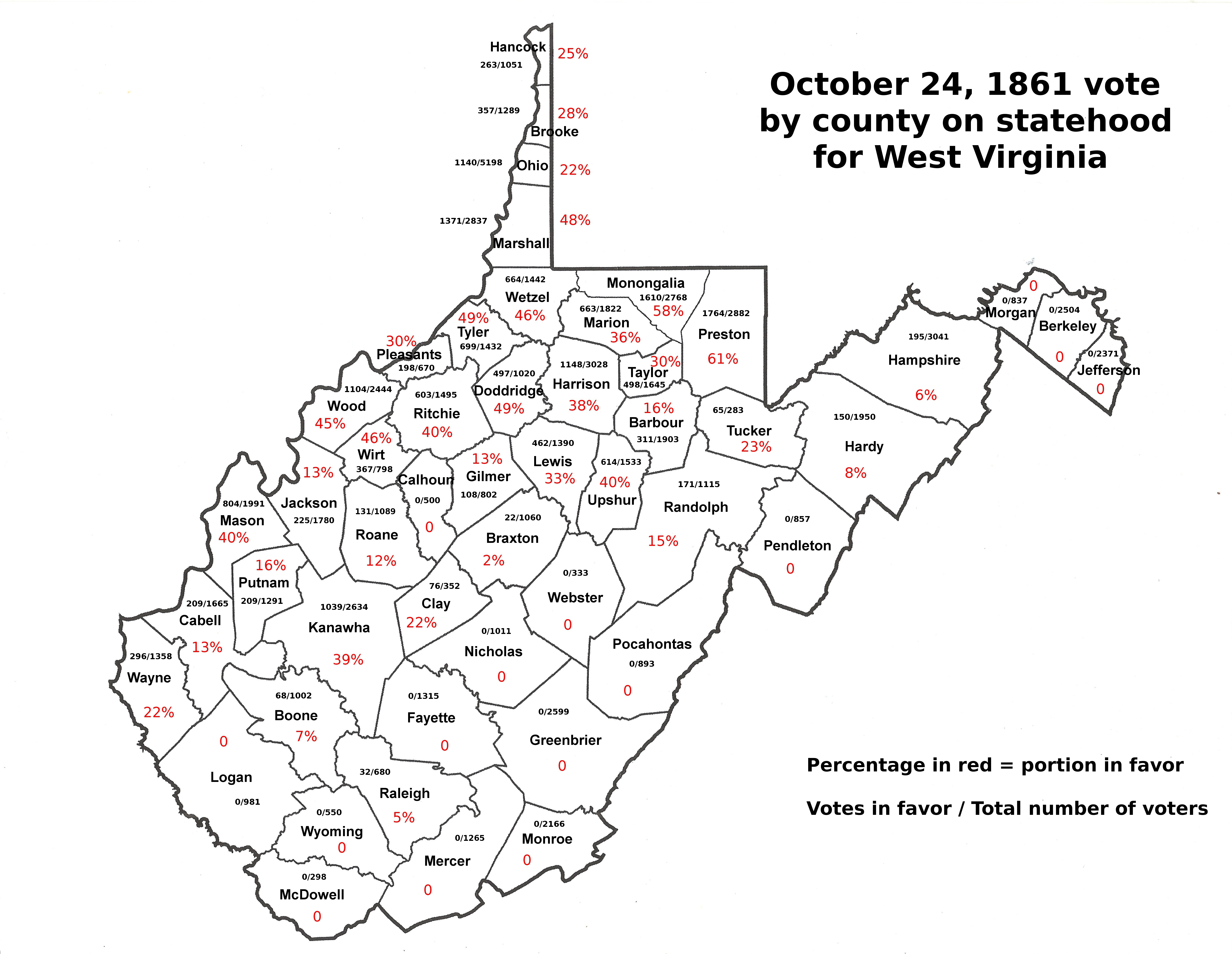
October 24, 1861 county vote for West Virginia statehood

The issue fractured the Unionist movement. Richard O. Curry divided the Unionists into four groups. "Thus, by the spring of 1862, Unionists of western Virginia had divided into four distinct factions: (1) opponents of statehood under any circumstances; (2) a militant free state group; (3) a moderate wing that feared the complications of the slavery question and attempted to avoid it; (4) a conservative faction that would oppose dismemberment rather than submit to Congressional interference."

A convention to draft the new state constitution met in Wheeling on Nov. 26, 1861, with 61 members. The original name of the new state Kanawha was changed to "West Virginia". Delegates began to expand the boundaries of the new state to include more counties, at one time taking in all of the Shenandoah Valley, but the final tally was 48 counties, and the counties of Berkeley and Jefferson, provided they approved the constitution, which was done by a very small turnout of voters and which led to the 1871 Supreme Court decision which permanently gave those counties to West Virginia.

On April 3, 1862 a public vote was held on the constitution for the new state with 51 counties listed in the returns, with only Frederick county not included in the new state. The results were nearly identical to the vote on the statehood ordinance; 18,862 in favor and 514 against, with 13 counties giving no vote at all.

Unionists who had been prominent supporters of the Wheeling government in 1861 found themselves on the outside by 1862. John Jay Jackson retired to his plantation in Wood County, Sherrard Clemens spoke against dismemberment throughout 1862, and even John Carlile, one of the primary proponents of statehood and one of Wheeling's "Virginia" senators in Washington, D.C., used his influence to derail the statehood bill. Wheeling's other senator, Waitman T. Willey, was able to restore the bill and attach an amendment to it authorizing gradual emancipation of slaves in the new state. Lincoln signed the statehood bill on Dec. 31, 1862.

On Jan. 1, 1863 Abraham Lincoln issued the Emancipation Proclamation which freed slaves in territory in rebellion against the United States. The proclamation specifically exempted the 48 counties which at that time constituted West Virginia, since as a newly constituted Union state West Virginia was technically not "in rebellion." In reality much of West Virginia was in de facto rebellion, particularly those counties that had voted for the secession ordinance. Arthur Boreman wrote to Gov. Pierpont on Feb. 27, 1863, stating "After you get a short distance below the Panhandle, it is not safe for a loyal man to go into the interior out of sight of the Ohio River." Nevertheless, with West Virginian statehood Lincoln and his administration was willing to treat the whole of the new state as if it had never rebelled, and any localities under Richmond's control as if they had been invaded and occupied by hostile Confederate forces regardless of the local population's views (i.e. a similar position to how the Union government regarded Maryland territory invaded by Lee a few months earlier, and Pennsylvanian territory occupied by the Confederate army later in 1863).

West Virginia's constitutional emancipation amendment, known as the Willey Amendment, was put to a public vote on April 4, 1863. If passed, the new state was to take effect on June 20, 1863, which it did. The Willey amendment freed no slaves during the war and provided no emancipation for any slave over the age of 21. Slavery was ended in West Virginia by the legislature on Feb. 3, 1865.

May 28, 1863 was the election date for new state offices. Arthur Boreman was elected the first governor of the new state. Elections were also held for Virginia state offices under the Confederacy and West Virginians in at least nine counties voted in those elections, though returns are incomplete. With the creation of West Virginia on June 20, 1863, Pierpont and the Restored Government of Virginia removed themselves to Alexandria, which was in Union control and later established themselves in Richmond at the war's end in 1865.

West Virginia civilians were arrested by both Confederate and Union authorities. Historian Mark E. Neely, Jr., found 337 cases of civilian arrest by the Confederacy in western Virginia, although this includes present-day southwestern Virginia as well as West Virginia. Hundreds of civilians were also arrested by Union authorities, although the total number has not yet been determined. Most were held in the Union prison Camp Chase in Columbus, Ohio, though some were also held at Fort Delaware.

=== Slavery ===
During the Civil War, a Unionist government in Wheeling, Virginia, presented a statehood bill to Congress in order to create a new state from 48 counties in western Virginia. The new state would eventually incorporate 50 counties. The issue of slavery in the new state delayed approval of the bill. In the Senate Charles Sumner objected to the admission of a new slave state, while Benjamin Wade defended statehood as long as a gradual emancipation clause would be included in the new state constitution. Two senators represented the Unionist Virginia government, John S. Carlile and Waitman T. Willey. Senator Carlile objected that Congress had no right to impose emancipation on West Virginia, while Willey proposed a compromise amendment to the state constitution for gradual abolition. Sumner attempted to add his own amendment to the bill, which was defeated, and the statehood bill passed both houses of Congress with the addition of what became known as the Willey Amendment. President Lincoln signed the bill on December 31, 1862. Voters in western Virginia approved the Willey Amendment on March 26, 1863.

The Emancipation Proclamation, issued by President Lincoln on January 1, 1863, did not apply to the border states (four slave states loyal to the Union) as well as some territories occupied by Union forces within Confederate states. Two additional counties were added to West Virginia in late 1863, Berkeley and Jefferson. The slaves in Berkeley were also under exemption but not those in Jefferson County. As of the census of 1860, the 49 exempted counties held some 6000 slaves over 21 years of age who would not have been emancipated, about 40 percent of the total slave population. The terms of the Willey Amendment only freed children, at birth or as they came of age, and prohibited the importation of slaves.

West Virginia became the 35th state on June 20, 1863, and the last slave state admitted to the Union. Eighteen months later, the West Virginia legislature completely abolished slavery, and also ratified the 13th Amendment on February 3, 1865.

=== Military events ===
In April 1861, Virginia troops under Thomas J. "Stonewall" Jackson occupied Harpers Ferry and part of the Baltimore and Ohio Railroad leading into western Virginia. They seized many B&O locomotives and railcars on May 23.

In May and June 1861, Confederate forces advanced into western Virginia to impose control by the Richmond government and the Confederacy. They got no further than Philippi, due to bad roads. Then Union troops under McClellan drove them back in July.

There was additional campaigning further south, where Greenbrier County was pro-Confederate, enabling Confederate troops to enter Nicholas County to the west. In September 1861, Union troops drove the Confederates out of Nicholas County and defeated their counterattack at Cheat Mountain.

Thereafter all of the trans-Allegheny region was under firm Union control except for the southern and eastern counties. Greenbrier County was occupied in May 1862. Pro-Confederate guerrillas burned and plundered in some sections, and were not entirely suppressed until after the war was ended.

There were two minor Confederate expeditions against the northeastern corner of the west later on: Jackson's Romney Expedition in January 1862; and the Jones-Imboden Raid in May–June 1863.

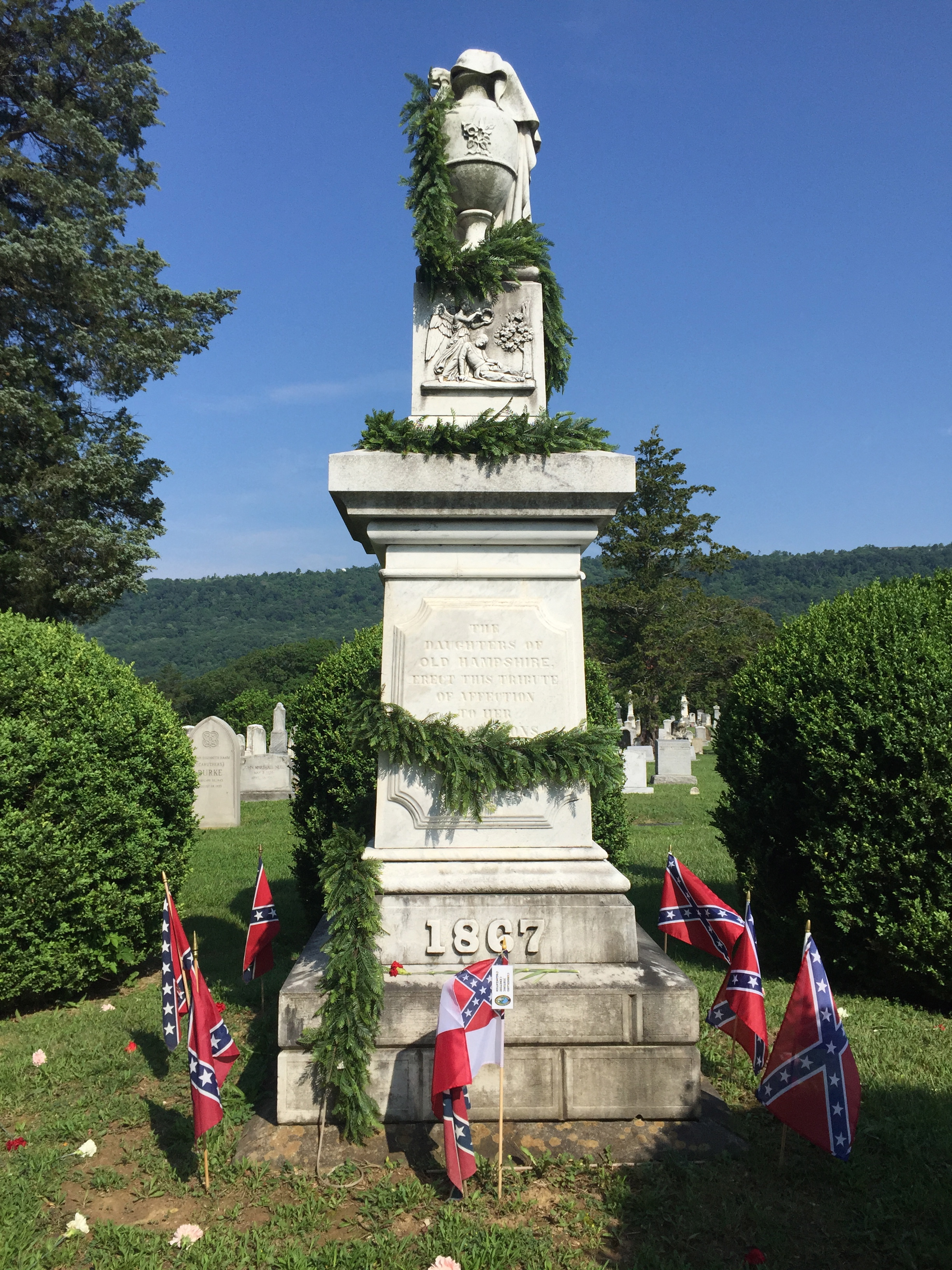
Confederate Memorial, Romney.

Union strategy for the region was to protect the vital B&O Railroad and also attack eastward into the Shenandoah Valley and southwestern Virginia. This latter goal proved impossible, due to the poor roads across mountainous terrain.

The B&O passed across the lower (northern) end of the Shenandoah, east of the Alleghenies. This area was therefore occupied by Union troops for nearly all of the war, and was a scene of frequent combat.

Harpers Ferry was the site of a major U.S. Army arsenal, and was taken by Confederates in the opening days of the war, and again during the Maryland Campaign of 1862. During the Maryland Campaign it was a route of invasion and retreat for the Army of Northern Virginia; the campaign concluded there with the Battle of Shepherdstown.

Soldiers from West Virginia served on both sides in the war. Because those in Confederate service were in "Virginia" regiments, the number of West Virginians who joined the Confederate States Army can only be roughly estimated. However, it is generally accepted that a clear majority of men under arms from the West Virginian counties on the new 1863 state border enlisted and fought with the Confederate forces.

Conversely, most soldiers from the state's more northerly counties enlisted in the Union Army. The men in Union service were also in "Virginia" regiments until statehood, when several Unionist "Virginia" regiments were redesignated "West Virginia" regiments. Among these were the 7th West Virginia Infantry, famed for actions at Antietam and Gettysburg, and the 3rd West Virginia Cavalry, which also fought at Gettysburg.

On the Confederate side, Albert G. Jenkins, a former U.S. Representative, recruited a brigade of cavalry in western Virginia, which he led until his death in May 1864. Other western Virginians served under Brig. Gen. John Imboden and in the Stonewall Brigade under Brig. Gen. James A. Walker.

== Guerrilla warfare ==
On May 28, 1861, one of the first trials of the Civil War for sabotage took place in Parkersburg, Virginia. A group of men were found playing cards under a B&O railroad bridge and arrested by Federal authorities. The trial was conducted by Judge William Lowther Jackson (later, Gen. W.L. Jackson, C.S.A.). The men were acquitted, since no actual crime had taken place, but Parkersburg was split over the verdict, and Judge Jackson left to join Col. Porterfield at Philippi.

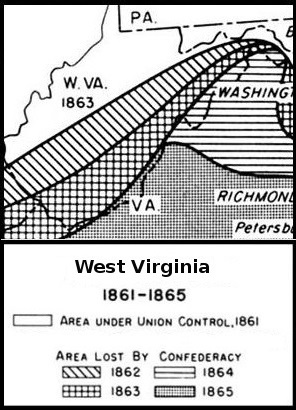
Union and Confederate territorial losses in West Virginia 1861-1865

With the defeat of Confederate forces at the Battle of Philippi and the Battle of Cheat Mountain only occasionally would they occupy parts of western Virginia. Local supporters of Richmond were left to their own devices. Many guerrilla units originated in the pre-war militia, and these were designated Virginia State Rangers and starting in June, 1862, these were incorporated into Virginia State Line regiments. By March, 1863, however, many were enlisted in the regular Confederate army.

There were others though who operated without sanction of the Richmond government, some fighting on behalf of the Confederacy, while others were nothing more than bandits who preyed on Union and Confederate alike. Early in the war captured guerrillas were sent to Camp Chase or Johnson Island in Ohio, Fort Delaware in Delaware and also the Atheneum in Wheeling. Some were paroled after taking an oath, but many returned to their guerrilla activities. The Union authorities began to organize their own guerrilla bands, the most famous of which was the "Snake Hunters", headed by Capt. Baggs. They patrolled Wirt and Calhoun counties through the winter of 1861–62 and captured scores of Moccasin Rangers, which they sent as prisoners to Wheeling.

The fight against the rebel guerrillas took a new turn under Gen. John C. Fremont and Col. George Crook, who had spent his pre-war career as an "Indian fighter" in the Pacific Northwest. Col. Crook took command of the 36th Ohio Infantry, centered around Summersville, Nicholas County. He trained them in guerrilla tactics and adopted a "no prisoners" policy.

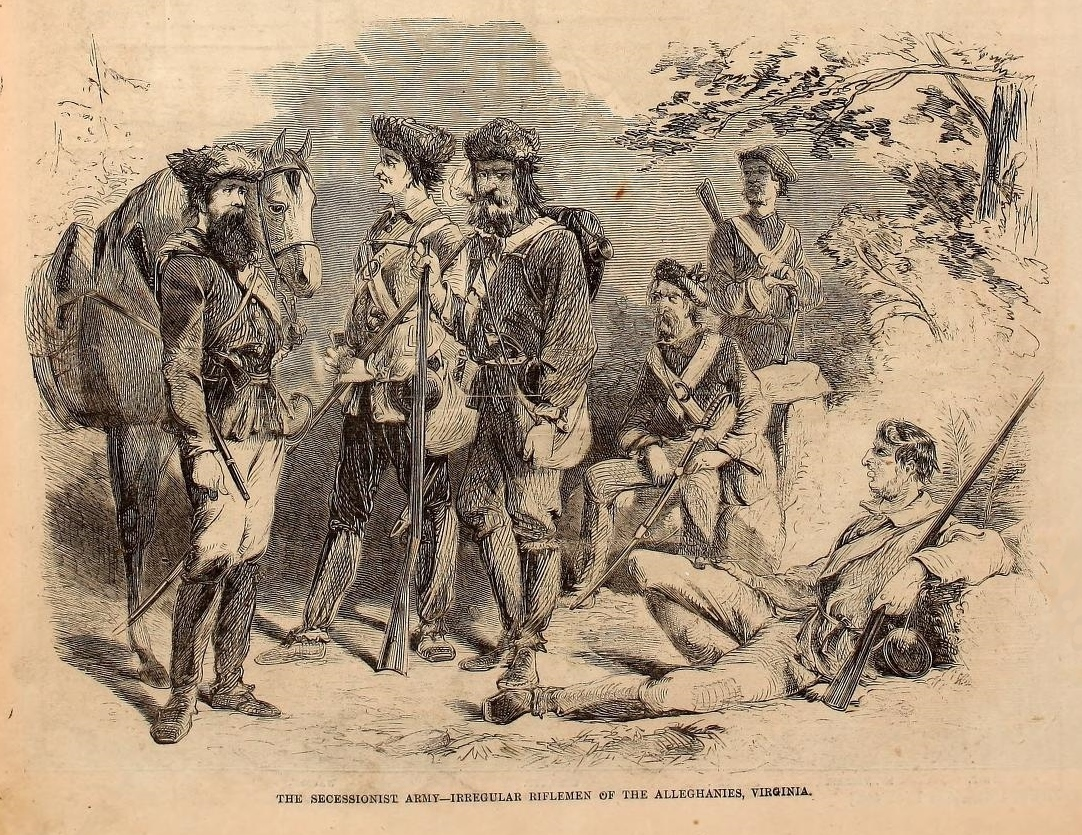
"The Secessionist Army-Irregular Riflemen of the Alleghanies, Virginia", Harper's Weekly, July 20, 1861

On January 1, 1862, Crook led his men on an expedition north to Sutton, Braxton County, where he believed Confederate forces were located. None were found, but his troops encountered heavy guerrilla resistance and responded by burning houses and towns along the line of march. But by August, 1862, Unionist efforts were severely hampered with the withdrawal of troops to eastern Virginia.

In this vacuum Gen. William W. Loring, C.S.A, recaptured the Kanawha valley, Gen. Albert Gallatin Jenkins, C.S.A., moved his forces through central West Virginia, capturing many supplies and prisoners. Confederate recruitment increased, Gen. Loring opening recruitment offices as far north as Ripley.

In response to rebel raids, Gen. Robert H. Milroy issued a command demanding reparations to be paid in cash and proceeded to assess fines against Tucker county citizens, guilty or not, and threatened them with the gallows or house-burning. Jefferson Davis and Confederate authorities lodged formal complaints with Gen. Henry Wager Halleck in Washington, who censured Gen. Milroy. However, Milroy argued in defense of his policy and was allowed to proceed.

By early 1863 Union efforts in West Virginia were going badly. Unionists were losing confidence in the Wheeling government to protect them, and with the approaching dismemberment of Virginia into two states guerrilla activity increased in an effort to prevent organization of county governments. By 1864 some stability had been achieved in some central counties, but guerrilla activity was never effectively countered. Union forces that were needed elsewhere were tied down in what many soldiers considered a backwater of the war. But Federal forces could not afford to ignore any rebel territory, particularly one so close to the Ohio River.

As late as January, 1865, Gov. Arthur I. Boreman complained of large scale guerrilla activity as far north as Harrison and Marion counties. The Wheeling government was unable to control more than 20 to 25 counties in the new state. In one last, brazen act of the guerrilla war, McNeill's Rangers of Hardy County kidnapped Generals George Crook and Benjamin F. Kelley from behind Union lines and delivered them as prisoners of war to Richmond. The Confederate surrender at Appomattox finally brought an end to guerrilla war in West Virginia.

== Soldiery ==
On May 30, 1861, Brig. Gen. George B. McClellan in Cincinnati wrote to President Lincoln: "I am confidently assured that very considerable numbers of volunteers can be raised in Western Virginia...". After nearly two months in the field in West Virginia he was less optimistic. He wrote to Gov. Francis Harrison Pierpont of the Restored Government of Virginia in Wheeling that he and his army were anxious to assist the new government, but that eventually they would be needed elsewhere, and that he urged that troops be raised "among the population". "Before I left Grafton I made requisitions for arms clothing etc for 10,000 Virginia troops — I fear that my estimate was much too large." On August 3, 1861, the Wellsburg "Herald" editorialized "A pretty condition Northwestern Virginia is in to establish herself as a separate state...after all the drumming and all the gas about a separate state she has actually organized in the field four not entire regiments of soldiers and one of these hails almost entirely from the Panhandle."

Similar difficulties were experienced by Confederate authorities at the beginning of the war. On May 14, 1861, Col. George A. Porterfield arrived in Grafton to secure volunteers, and reported slow enlistment. Col. Porterfield's difficulty ultimately, however, was lack of support by the Richmond government, which did not send enough guns, tents and other supplies. He eventually turned away hundreds of volunteers due to lack of equipment. Gen. Henry A. Wise also complained of recruitment in the Kanawha valley, though he eventually assembled 2,500 infantry, 700 cavalry, three battalions of artillery for a total of 4,000 men which became known as "Wise's Legion". One regiment from the Wise legion, the 3rd Infantry (later reorganized as the 60th Virginia Infantry) was sent to South Carolina in 1862, and it was from Maj. Thomas Broun of the 3rd Infantry that Gen. Robert E. Lee bought his famous horse Traveller.

In April 1862 the Confederate government instituted a military draft, and nearly a year later the U.S. government did the same. The Confederate draft was not generally effective in West Virginia due to the breakdown of Virginia state government in the western counties and Union occupation of the northern counties, although conscription did occur in the southern counties. In the southern and eastern counties of West Virginia Confederate recruitment continued at least until the beginning of 1865.

The Wheeling government asked for an exemption to the Federal draft, saying that they had exceeded their quota under previous calls. An exemption was granted for 1864, but in 1865 a new demand was made for troops, which Gov. Boreman struggled to fill. In some counties, ex-Confederates suddenly found themselves enrolled in the U.S. Army.

The loyalty of some Federal troops had been questioned early in the war. The rapid conquest of northern West Virginia had caught a number of Southern sympathizers behind Union lines. A series of letters to Gen. Samuels and Gov. Pierpoint in the Dept. of Archives and History in Charleston, most dated 1862, reveal the concern of Union officers. Col. Harris, 10th Company, March 27, 1862, to Gov. Pierpoint: "The election of officers in the Gilmer County Company was a farce. The men elected were rebels and bushwhackers. The election of these men was intended, no doubt, as a burlesque on the reorganization of the militia."

Because the government in Richmond did not keep separate military records for what would become West Virginia, there has never been an official count of Confederate service in West Virginia. Early estimates were very low, in 1901 historians Fast & Maxwell placed the figure at about 7,000. An exception to the low estimates is found in Why The Solid South?, whose authors believed the Confederate numbers exceeded Union numbers. In subsequent histories the estimates rose, Otis K. Rice placed the number at 10,000-12,000. Richard O. Curry in 1964 placed the figure at 15,000. The first detailed study of Confederate soldiery estimates the number at 18,000, which is close to the 18,642 figure stated by the Confederate Dept. of Western Virginia in 1864. In 1989 a study by James Carter Linger estimated the number at nearly 22,000.

The official number of Union soldiers from West Virginia is 31,884 as stated by the Provost Marshal General of the United States. These numbers include, however, re-enlistment figures as well as out-of-state soldiers who enlisted in West Virginia regiments. In 1905 Charles H. Ambler estimated the number of native Union soldiers to be about 20,000.

Richard N. Current estimated native Union numbers at 29,000. In his calculations, however, he only allowed for a deduction of 2,000 out-of-state soldiers in West Virginia regiments. Ohio contributed nearly 5,000, with about 2,000 from Pennsylvania and other states.

In 1995 the George Tyler Moore Center for the Study of the Civil War began a soldier-by-soldier count of all regiments that would include West Virginians, both Union and Confederate. They concluded that West Virginia contributed approximately 20,000-22,000 men each to both the Union and Confederate governments.

== Nursing during the Civil War ==
The Sisters of St. Joseph, who operated Wheeling Hospital in that city, were nurses during the war. They treated soldiers brought to the hospital and prisoners at the Athenaeum in downtown Wheeling. In 1864, the Union army took control of the hospital, and the sisters went on the federal payroll as matrons and nurses, beginning that summer. Several of them later received pensions in recognition of their service.

== Civil War battles in West Virginia ==
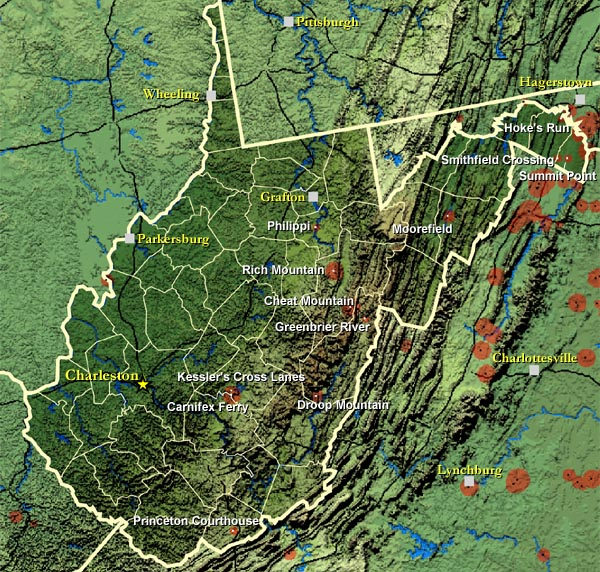
Civil War battles fought in West Virginia

The Manassas Campaign:

- Battle of Hoke's Run (July 2, 1861), Berkeley County – Stonewall Jackson successfully delays a larger Union force.

The Western Virginia Campaign:

- Battle of Philippi (June 3, 1861), Barbour County – Union victory propels George McClellan into the limelight.
- Battle of Laurel Hill (July 7–11, 1861), Barbour County – Morris routs Confederate troops in 5 days of skirmishing at Belington in a diversionary attack as the opening portion of the Battle of Rich Mountain.
- Battle of Rich Mountain (July 11, 1861), Randolph County – Another McClellan victory propels him to high command.
- Battle of Corrick's Ford (July 13, 1861), Tucker County – Confederate Brig. Gen. Robert S. Garnett is the first general officer killed in the war.
- Battle of Kessler's Cross Lanes (August 26, 1861), Nicholas County – Confederates rout Tyler's Union force; Lee arrives soon after.
- Battle of Carnifex Ferry (September 10, 1861), Nicholas County – Rosecrans drives back the Confederates and wins more territory.
- Battle of Cheat Mountain (September 12–15, 1861), Pocahontas County – Lee is beaten and is recalled to Richmond.
- Battle of Greenbrier River (October 3, 1861), Pocahontas County – Inconclusive fight brings only bloodshed, but no resolution.
- Battle of Barboursville (July 13, 1861) Cabell County - 5 Companies of the 2nd Kentucky Infantry routes The Border Rangers and local militia atop “Fortification Hill” (Now occupied by Veterans Affairs)
- Battle of Scary Creek (July 17, 1861), Putnam County - The Battle of Scary Creek was a minor battle fought during the American Civil War across the Kanawha River from present-day Nitro.
- Battle of Guyandotte (November 10–11, 1861), Cabell County– Confederate cavalry attacks the town and the small untrained Union force stationed there. In retaliation, much of the town is burned by the Union the next day.
- Battle of Camp Allegheny (December 13, 1861), Pocahontas County – Union attack is repulsed and both sides camp for the winter.

Later actions:

- Battle of Hancock (January 5–6, 1862), Morgan County – Stonewall Jackson's operations against the B&O Railroad.
- Battle of the Henry Clark House (May 1, 1862), Mercer County – Stonewall Jackson's Shenandoah Valley Campaign – Cox's actions against Princeton and the Virginia & Tennessee Railroad at Dublin, Virginia.
- Battle of Princeton Court House (May 16–18, 1862), Mercer County – Jackson's Shenandoah Valley Campaign – Cox's actions against the Virginia & Tennessee Railroad at Dublin, Virginia.

The Kanawha Valley Campaign of 1862:

- Jenkins's trans-Allegheny raid (August 22, 1862 – September 13, 1862) - Brigadier General Albert Jenkins' Cavalry runs a circular route behind enemy lines in an attempt to get behind the Union army and block its route of retreat—while Major General William W. Loring prepares a frontal attack to drive the Union Army out of the Kanawha River Valley.
- Battle of Fayetteville (September 10, 1862) Union Colonel Edward Siber's brigade cannot stop multiple brigades led by Confederate Major General Loring as the Confederate army advances in its goal to drive Union forces out of the Kanawha River Valley.
- Battle of Charleston (September 13, 1862), Kanawha County – Loring's Confederates take Charleston while Union forces retreat to Ohio.

Other later actions:

- Battle of Harpers Ferry (September 12–15, 1862), Jefferson County – Jackson surrounds the town and forces its garrison to surrender.
- Battle of Shepherdstown (September 19–20, 1862), Jefferson County – A. P. Hill's counterattack secures Lee's retreat from Sharpsburg.
- Battle of Hurricane Bridge (March 28, 1863), Putnam County – Skirmish between Union & Confederate forces.
- Jones-Imboden Raid (April–May, 1863)- Confederates look to disrupt Union operations in Western Virginia.
- Battle of White Sulphur Springs (August 26–27, 1863), Greenbrier County – Col. George Patton turns back Averell's raid against Lewisburg.
- Battle of Bulltown (October 13, 1863), Braxton County – Union garrison holds against Confederate attack.
- Battle of Droop Mountain (November 6, 1863), Pocahontas County – As a result of the Union victory, Confederate resistance in the state essentially collapsed.
- Battle of Moorefield (August 7, 1864), Hardy County – Union cavalry drives off John McCausland's Confederate cavalry and captured nearly 500 men.
- Battle of Summit Point (August 21, 1864), Jefferson County – Inconclusive action during Union Maj. Gen. Philip Sheridan's Shenandoah Valley Campaign.
- Battle of Smithfield Crossing (August 25–29, 1864), Jefferson and Berkeley counties – Inconclusive. Two of Jubal Early's infantry divisions force back a Union cavalry division and are stopped by an infantry counterattack.

== West Virginians in the Civil War ==
Union

- Francis H. Pierpont, "Father of West Virginia" - Governor of West Virginia (reorganized government) from Monongalia County in 1861 to 1863
- Arthur I. Boreman - Governor of West Virginia from Tyler County in 1863 to 1869
- Isaac H. Duval - Brigadier General and politician from Wellsburg (Brooke County)
- Nathan Goff Jr. - Major from Clarksburg (Harrison County), became Secretary of the Navy and Governor of West Virginia
- Thomas M. Harris - Brigadier General from Harrisville (Richie County)
- Daniel D. Johnson - Colonel (infantry) and Senator from Tyler County
- Benjamin F. Kelley - Brigadier General residing at Wheeling
- George R. Latham - Colonel (infantry) and Congressman residing at Grafton (Taylor County)
- Fabricius A. Cather - Major (1st West Virginia Cavalry) from Taylor County
- Joseph A.J. Lightburn - Brigadier General from Lewis County
- Jesse L. Reno - Major General from Wheeling
- David H. Strother - Colonel (cavalry) from Martinsburg (Berkeley County)
- William B. Curtis - Colonel (12th West Virginia Infantry), later Brevet Brigadier General, from Putnam County
- Joseph Thoburn - Irish-born Colonel (infantry) from Wheeling
- John Hinebaugh - Second Lieutenant (6th West Virginia Cavalry) from Preston County
- John Witcher - Bvt. Brigadier General (cavalry) from Cabell County, became U.S. Congressman
- James F. Ellis - Corporal (15th West Virginia Infantry) from Lewis County
- Joseph Snider - Colonel (infantry) from Monongalia County
- Martin R. Delany - Major (104th regiment of the United States Colored Troops) from Jefferson County

26 Medals of Honor were credited to West Virginians for actions during the war. Another 6 medals were awarded to West Virginians who relocated and were credited to service in other state regiments.
A total of 14 medals were awarded to soldiers of the 1st West Virginia Cavalry; making it one of the highest decorated regiments of the Union Army.

Confederate

- Belle Boyd - female spy who provided intelligence to the Confederate States Army
- Allen T. Caperton - one of the Confederate Senators for Virginia, later a U.S. Senator for West Virginia, from Monroe County
- Raleigh E. Colston - Brigadier General residing in Berkeley County
- Charles J. Faulkner - Lieutenant Colonel, U.S. Congressman and diplomat detained as a prisoner early in the war
- Birkett D. Fry - Brigadier General and former filibuster from Kanawha County
- John Echols Brigadier General from Monroe County, commander of the Dept. of Western Virginia who led a brigade composed of many West Virginia soldiers
- George M. Edgar - Lt. Colonel and founder of Edgar's Battalion, became president of a university that would later be named University of Arkansas and also a seminary that eventually became Florida State University
- Walter Gwynn - Brigadier General from Jefferson County
- William Lowther Jackson - Brigadier General and former Lt. Governor from Clarksburg (Harrison County)
- Thomas J. "Stonewall" Jackson - Lieutenant General from Clarksburg (Harrison County)
- Albert G. Jenkins - Brigadier General former U.S. Congressman from Cabell County who led a brigade of western Virginia cavalrymen
- John McCausland - Brigadier General residing at Point Pleasant (Mason County)
- John Hanson McNeill - Captain and partisan commander from Moorefield (Hardy County)
- Alexander W. Monroe - Colonel and politician from Hampshire County
- John Q.A. Nadenbousch - Colonel (infantry) from Berkeley County
- Edwin Gray Lee - Brigadier General from Shepherdstown (Jefferson County)
- Charles T. O'Ferrall - Colonel (cavalry) and politician from Berkeley Springs (Morgan Country), became Governor of Virginia
- George S. Patton Sr. - Lieutenant Colonel from Charleston, mortally wounded at Battle of Opequon; the grandfather and namesake of American World War II general George S. Patton Jr.
- George A. Porterfield - Colonel (infantry) from Berkeley County
- M. Jeff Thompson - Brigadier General in the Missouri State Guard from Harpers Ferry

== See also ==
- Confederate government of West Virginia
- Confederate States of America - Animated map of state secession and state formation
- Restored government of Virginia
- Romney, West Virginia during the American Civil War
- West Virginia Civil War Union units
- West Virginia Civil War Confederate Units
- Wheeling Convention
- White Top
