= Battle of Lynchburg order of battle: Confederate =

American Civil War order of battle

The following Confederate army units were involved in the Battle of Lynchburg on June 17–18, 1864, near Lynchburg, Virginia, in the American Civil War. The Union units are shown separately. The Confederate force, commanded by Lieutenant General Jubal Early in cooperation with Major General John C. Breckinridge, consisted of brigades, divisions, and part of a corps. Both infantry and cavalry were involved—plus artillery. Confederate cavalry units delayed the Union approach to Lynchburg, enabling Confederate infantry forces to arrive in Lynchburg in time to defend the city.

== Abbreviations used ==
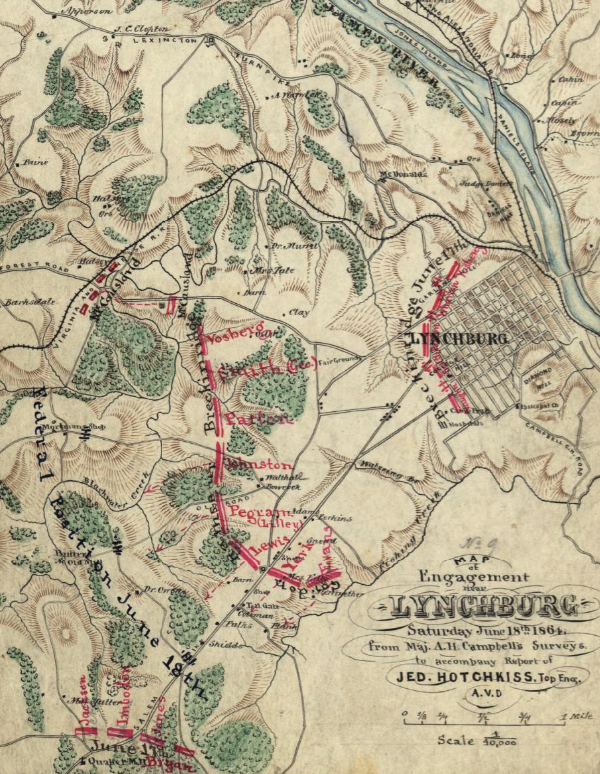
Map from the report of Confederate engineer Jedediah Hotchkiss

Units listed under "Regiments and Others" are regiments unless noted otherwise in "Additional information".

=== Military rank ===
- LG = Lieutenant General
- MG = Major General
- BG = Brigadier General
- Col = Colonel
- Ltc = Lieutenant Colonel
- Maj = Major
- Capt = Captain
- Lt = 1st Lieutenant

=== Other ===
- w = wounded
- k = killed
- det = Detachment

== Confederate Army ==
=== City (Lynchburg) Command ===
BG Francis T. Nicholls - Until the arrival of Breckinridge, Nicholls and his small force were the only defenders of Lynchburg other than cavalry positioned between the city and advancing Union forces. Nicholls was missing he left arm and left leg—lost in separate battles.

Group	Unit
BG Francis T. Nicholls	Convalescents and invalids - Consisted of Lynchburg hospital patients.; Silver Grays City Home Guard - Locals that ranged in ages from 15 years to 81 years. They had "possibly four guns" (artillery pieces).; V.M.I. Cadets - Brought six artillery pieces to Lynchburg.; Botetourt Artillery - Captain Henry C. Douthat commanded this six piece unit.

=== Breckinridge's Division, Trans–Alleghany Department ===
MG John C. Breckinridge, commanding Breckinridge's Division (except King's Artillery Battalion and the Maryland Line) was ordered back to the Shenandoah Valley on June 7, 1864. Because of injuries from an earlier battle, Breckinridge was bedridden. He had D.H. Hill, who was visiting Lynchburg, organize the city's positioning of troops for the city's defense.

- MG D.H. Hill, unofficial command - Traveled to Lynchburg per orders from General P. G. T. Beauregard to offer assistance to Brigadier General F.T. Nicholls, arriving before Lieutenant General Jubal Early. Breckinridge was bedridden because of injuries suffered in an earlier battle, and gave Hill unofficial command of Lynchburg. Hill set up the city's defense by positioning brigades and artillery around the city. He also ordered the construction of redoubts and trenches.
- MG Arnold Elzey - Took official command of Lynchburg on the afternoon of June 18, but only participated in the pursuit after the battle.

BG Gabriel C. Wharton, division commander

Brigade	Regiments and Others
Wharton/Forsberg Brigade Col Augustus Forsberg	45th Virginia Infantry; 50th Virginia Infantry; 51st Virginia Infantry; 30th Virginia Sharpshooters Battalion (Clarke's); Additional Information: A map by Jedediah Hotchkiss of the Lynchburg battlefield identifies Wharton's Brigade as Forsberg's Brigade. On June 17, the brigade was positioned on the north side of Lynchburg not far from the Virginia & Tennessee Railroad. On June 18, the brigade was positioned further west.; The 45th Virginia Infantry Regiment was depleted by 450 casualties in the June 5 Battle of Piedmont—including Colonel William H. Browne (mortally wounded and captured), Lieutenant Colonel Alexander M. Davis (captured), and Major William C. Sanders (wounded and captured).
Echols/Patton Brigade Col George S. Patton Sr.	22nd Virginia Infantry; 23rd Virginia Infantry Battalion; 26th Virginia Infantry Battalion; Additional Information: A map by Jedediah Hotchkiss of the Lynchburg battlefield identifies Echol's Brigade as Patton's Brigade. It was positioned on the west side of Lynchburg on June 17, and moved further west on June 18.; The 23rd Virginia Infantry Battalion was also known as Derrick's Battalion.; The 26th Virginia Infantry Battalion was also known as Edgar's Battalion.; The combination of Forsberg's and Patton's brigades totaled to about 2,100 soldiers.
McCausland/Smith Brigade Col Thomas J. Smith	36th Virginia Infantry; 45th Virginia Infantry Battalion; 60th Virginia Infantry; Additional Information: Although listed by one author in the order-of-battle for Lynchburg, there is little evidence that this brigade fought—and it was seriously depleted at the Battle of Piedmont on June 5.; The commander of a brigade consisting of the 36th and 60th Virginia Infantry Regiments, Colonel Beuhring H. Jones of the 60th Virginia, was captured at the Battle of Piedmont.; The 36th Virginia Infantry Regiment, which consisted of fewer than 500 fighters at Piedmont, was depleted in that battle by 177 casualties.; The 45th Virginia Battalion consisted of approximately 175 fighters at the beginning of the Battle of Piedmont.; An additional source does not list any of the three Virginia units as fighting at Lynchburg.; All three Virginia units do not have Lynchburg mentioned by the National Park Service, although Piedmont is mentioned for the 36th and 60th Virginia Infantries.; A map by Jedediah Hotchkiss of the Lynchburg battlefield identifies a "Geo" Smith Brigade (not T Smith, possibly Colonel George H. Smith) as part of Breckinridge's command positioned on the west side of Lynchburg on June 18 between Forsberg and Patton.
Major Floyd King's; Artillery Battalion	Chapman's Virginia Artillery Battery; Bryan's Virginia Artillery Battery; Lowry's Virginia Artillery Battery; Additional Information: A map by Jedediah Hotchkiss of the Lynchburg battlefield shows Bryan's Battery positioned near the Salem Turnpike southwest of Lynchburg on June 17.

=== Second Corps, Army of Northern Virginia ===
Only a portion of this corps, listed below, arrived in time for the battle.

LTG Jubal Early

Division	Brigade	Regiments and Others
Early/Ramseur Division; MG Stephen D. Ramseur	Pegram's Brigade BG John D. Lilley	13th Virginia Infantry; 31st Virginia Infantry; 49th Virginia Infantry; 52nd Virginia Infantry; 58th Virginia Infantry; Additional Information: A map by Jedediah Hotchkiss of the Lynchburg battlefield shows Johnston's Brigade positioned on June 18 between the Old Road and the Salem Turnpike southwest of Lynchburg.
Early/Ramseur Division; MG Stephen D. Ramseur	Johnston's Brigade BG Robert D. Johnston	5th North Carolina Infantry; 12th North Carolina Infantry; 20th North Carolina Infantry; 23rd North Carolina Infantry; Additional Information: A map by Jedediah Hotchkiss of the Lynchburg battlefield shows Johnston's Brigade positioned on June 18 north of Pegram's Brigade and the Old Road, southwest of Lynchburg.
Early/Ramseur Division; MG Stephen D. Ramseur	Lewis' Brigade (Note: While Hotchkiss identifies this brigade as part of Ramseur's Division, Walker is unclear (possibly Gordon's). A historian for the 6th Virginia Infantry says "Early's Division, to which the Sixth Regiment belonged" when discussing the Battle of Lynchburg. The Order of Battle for the early June Battle of Cold Harbor lists Lewis's Brigade (a.k.a. Hoke's Brigade) as part of Pickett's Division in I Corps instead of II Corps. In the July 9, 1864, Battle of Monocacy, Lewis' Brigade is listed as part of Ramseur's Division.) BG William G. Lewis	6th North Carolina Infantry; 21st North Carolina Infantry; 54th North Carolina Infantry; 57th North Carolina Infantry; 1st North Carolina Sharpshooter Battalion; Additional Information: A map by Jedediah Hotchkiss of the Lynchburg battlefield shows Lewis' Brigade positioned on June 18 on the north side of the Salem Turnpike, between Pegram and York's brigades, southwest of Lynchburg.
Gordon's Division (partial); MG John B. Gordon	York's Brigade BG Zebulon York	5th Louisiana Infantry; 6th Louisiana Infantry; 7th Louisiana Infantry; 8th Louisiana Infantry; 9th Louisiana Infantry; 1st Louisiana Infantry 2nd Louisiana Infantry 10th Louisiana Infantry 14th Louisiana Infantry 15th Louisiana Infantry; Additional Information: The remnants of the Louisiana Infantry regiments in this brigade were brigaded together into two brigades, making York's Brigade a consolidated Louisiana brigade.; A map by Jedediah Hotchkiss of the Lynchburg battlefield shows York's Brigade positioned on June 18 on the south side of the Salem Turnpike, between Lewis and Evans' brigades, southwest of Lynchburg.
Gordon's Division (partial); MG John B. Gordon	Evan's Brigade BG Clement A. Evans	13th Georgia Infantry; 26th Georgia Infantry; 31st Georgia Infantry; 38th Georgia Infantry; 60th Georgia Infantry; 61st Georgia Infantry; 12th Georgia Infantry Battalion; Additional Information: A map by Jedediah Hotchkiss of the Lynchburg battlefield shows Evans' Brigade positioned on June 18 on the south side of the Salem Turnpike, forming the extreme left flank, southwest of Lynchburg.

=== Cavalry, Department of Western Virginia ===
MG Robert Ransom, commanding - On June 13, Ransom was ordered to take command of all cavalry in the Department of Western Virginia, reporting to Breckinridge. Ransom did not arrive in Lynchburg until 4:00 pm on June 18.

Brigade	Regiments (unless noted otherwise)
McCausland's Cavalry Col John McCausland	14th Virginia Cavalry - Commanded by Col James A. Cochran.; 16th Virginia Cavalry - Commanded by Maj James H. Nounnan.; 17th Virginia Cavalry - Commanded by Ltc W.C. Tavenner.; 21st Virginia Cavalry - commanded by Col William E. Peters; Additional Information: A map by Jedediah Hotchkiss of the Lynchburg battlefield shows McCausland's Cavalry positioned west of Lynchburg, near Forest Road and the Virginia & Tennessee Railroad.
Jackson's Cavalry Col William L. "Mudwall" Jackson	1st Maryland Cavalry; 19th Virginia Cavalry; 20th Virginia Cavalry; 46th Virginia Cavalry Battalion; 47th Virginia Cavalry Battalion; 26th Virginia Cavalry; 37th Virginia Cavalry Battalion; Additional Information: A map by Jedediah Hotchkiss of the Lynchburg battlefield shows Jackson's Cavalry positioned near the Salem Turnpike southwest of Lynchburg on June 17.
Imboden's Cavalry BG John D. Imboden	18th Virginia Cavalry; 23rd Virginia Cavalry; 62nd Virginia Mounted Infantry; 25th Virginia Cavalry; Additional Information: Imboden's cavalry had suffered significant losses in the Battle of Piedmont that occurred earlier in June.; The 62nd Virginia Mounted Infantry lost their commander, Lieutenant Colonel Robert L. Doyle, when he was killed in the June 5 Battle of Piedment.; A map by Jedediah Hotchkiss of the Lynchburg battlefield shows Jackson's Cavalry positioned near the Salem Turnpike southwest of Lynchburg on June 17.
Vaughn's Mounted Infantry BG John C. Vaughn	1st Tennessee Mounted Infantry Regiment; 43rd Tennessee Mounted Infantry Battalion; 16th Tennessee Infantry Battalion; 16th Tennessee Mounted Infantry Regiment (remnants); 61st Tennessee Mounted Infantry Regiment (remnants); 62nd Tennessee Mounted Infantry (remnants); Additional Information: A map by Jedediah Hotchkiss of the Lynchburg battlefield shows Vaughn's Infantry positioned on the southwest edge of Lynchburg on June 17.; Vaughn was the senior cavalry brigadier until Ransom arrived.
Jones' Cavalry under Vaughn	8th Virginia Cavalry; 21st Virginia Cavalry; 22nd Virginia Cavalry; 34th Virginia Cavalry Battalion; 36th Virginia Cavalry Battalion; Additional Information: BG William E. "Grumble" Jones was killed on June 5 in the Battle of Piedmont.; A map by Jedediah Hotchkiss of the Lynchburg battlefield shows Jones' Cavalry positioned near the Salem Turnpike southwest of Lynchburg on June 17.
Horse Artillery	Berkeley's Battery - 2 artillery pieces from McClanahan's Artillery, commanded by Lt Carter Berkeley; W.S. Lurty's Battery - 2 artillery pieces; Additional Information: McClanahan's Virginia Horse Artillery was also known as Staunton Artillery.; Lurty's Company, Virginia horse Artillery, was assigned to W.J. Jackson's cavalry in February 1864.

== Notes ==
=== References ===
- Blackford, Charles Minor (1901). Campaign and Battle of Lynchburg, Va. Lynchburg, Virginia: J.P. Bell. OCLC 2958018.
- Clark, Walter, ed. (1901). Histories of the Several Regiments and Battalions from North Carolina, in the Great War 1861-'65 Vol. I. Raleigh, North Carolina: E.M. Uzzell. OCLC 1300611.
- Davis, William C. (1974). Breckinridge: Statesman, Soldier, Symbol. Baton Rouge, Louisiana: Louisiana State Unibersity Press. ISBN 978-0-80711-805-4. OCLC 900543965.
- Duncan, Richard R. (1998). Lee's Endangered Left: The Civil War in Western Virginia, Spring of 1864. Baton Rouge, Louisiana: Louisiana State University Press. OCLC 940541407.
- King, Curtis S.; Robertson, William Glenn; Clay, Steven E. (2009). Staff Ride Handbook for the Overland Campaign, Virginia, 4 May to 15 June 1864: A Study in Operational–Level Command (Second Edition) (PDF). Fort Leavenworth, Kansas: Combat Studies Institute Press.
- Otey, John M. (1892). "Special Orders, No.23, Headquarters Department of North Carolina and Southern Virginia". In Davis, George B.; Perry, Leslie J.; Kirkley, Joseph W. (eds.). The War of the Rebellion: a Compilation of the Official Records of the Union and Confederate Armies Series I Volume XL Part II. Washington, DC: Government Printing Office. pp. 648–649. OCLC 318422190.
- Sifakis, Stewart (2006). Compendium of the Confederate Armies - Virginia. Bowie, Maryland: Heritage Books. ISBN 978-1-58549-701-0. OCLC 54369824.
- Walker, Gary C. (1989). Hunter's Fiery Raid Through Virginia Valleys. Roanoke, Virginia: A & W Enterprise. OCLC 21340468.
- Wallace, Lee A. (1986). A Guide to Virginia Military Organizations 1861-1865. Lynchburg, Virginia: H.E. Howard, Inc. ISBN 978-0-93091-930-6. OCLC 1003746760.
- Withers, John (1892). "Special Orders, No.137, Adjt. and Insp. General's Office, Richmond". In Davis, George B.; Perry, Leslie J.; Kirkley, Joseph W. (eds.). The War of the Rebellion: a Compilation of the Official Records of the Union and Confederate Armies Series I Volume XL Part II. Washington, DC: Government Printing Office. pp. 645–646. OCLC 318422190.
