= Second Battle of Kernstown order of battle: Confederate =

The following Confederate States Army units and commanders fought in the American Civil War's Second Battle of Kernstown on July 24, 1864, in Kernstown, now part of the Virginia city of Winchester. The Union order of battle is shown separately.

== Abbreviations used ==
=== Military rank ===
- GEN = General
- LTG = Lieutenant General
- MG = Major General
- BG = Brigadier General
- Col = Colonel
- Ltc = Lieutenant Colonel
- Maj = Major
- Cpt = Captain
- Lt = Lieutenant
- Bvt = Brevet Rank

=== Other ===
- w = wounded
- mw = mortally wounded
- k = killed

== Army of the Valley ==
LTG Jubal A. Early

=== Breckinridge’s Command ===
MG John C. Breckinridge

Division	Brigade	Regiments and Others
First Division (Echols’ Division); BG Gabriel C. Wharton	Wharton's Brigade; Col Augustus Forsberg	30th Virginia Sharpshooters Battalion; 45th Virginia Infantry - Maj Francis Miller; 51st Virginia Infantry
First Division (Echols’ Division); BG Gabriel C. Wharton	Echols’ Brigade Col George S. Patton	22nd Virginia Infantry - Ltc Charles S. McDonald; 23rd Virginia Infantry Battalion - Ltc Clarence Derrick; 26th Virginia Infantry Battalion - Ltc George Edgar
First Division (Echols’ Division); BG Gabriel C. Wharton	Smith's Brigade Col Thomas A. Smith	36th Virginia Infantry; 45th Virginia Infantry Battalion; 60th Virginia Infantry; Thomas' Legion - Col James R. Love II
Second Division (Gordon's Division); MG John B. Gordon	Evans’ Brigade Col Edmund N. Atkinson	13th Georgia Infantry - Ltc John H. Baker; 26th Georgia Infantry - Ltc James Blain; 31st Georgia Infantry - Col John H. Lowe; 38th Georgia Infantry - Ltc Philip E. Davant; 60th Georgia Infantry - Col. Waters B. Jones (?); Cpt Milton Russell; 61st Georgia Infantry - Cpt Eliphalet F. Sharp; 12th Georgia Infantry Battalion - Cpt James W. Anderson
Second Division (Gordon's Division); MG John B. Gordon	York's Consolidated Louisiana Brigade BG Zebulon York	Hays’s Old Brigade (Louisiana Tigers) - Col William R. Peck: 5th Louisiana Infantry; 6th Louisiana Infantry - Maj Alexander Hart; 7th Louisiana Infantry; 8th Louisiana Infantry; 9th Louisiana Infantry; Stafford’s Old Brigade - Col Eugene Waggaman: 1st Louisiana Infantry; 2nd Louisiana Infantry; 10th Louisiana Infantry; 14th Louisiana Infantry; 15th Louisiana Infantry
Second Division (Gordon's Division); MG John B. Gordon	Terry's Consolidated Virginia Brigade BG William Terry	Stonewall Brigade - Col John H. Stover Funk: 2nd Virginia Infantry; 4th Virginia Infantry; 5th Virginia Infantry; 27th Virginia Infantry; 33rd Virginia Infantry; Jones’s Old Second Brigade - Col Robert H. Dungan: 21st Virginia Infantry; 25th Virginia Infantry; 42nd Virginia Infantry; 44th Virginia Infantry; 48th Virginia Infantry; 50th Virginia Infantry; Steuart’s Old Third Brigade - Cpt William B. Yancy: 10th Virginia Infantry; 23rd Virginia Infantry; 37th Virginia Infantry

=== Forces reporting directly to Gen. Early ===
Division	Brigade	Regiments and Others
Rodes’ Division; MG Robert E. Rodes	Battle's Brigade Col Samuel Pickens	3rd Alabama Infantry; 5th Alabama Infantry; 6th Alabama Infantry; 12th Alabama Infantry; 61st Alabama Infantry
Rodes’ Division; MG Robert E. Rodes	Grimes’ Brigade Ltc James Moorehead	32nd North Carolina Infantry; 43rd North Carolina Infantry; 45th North Carolina Infantry; 53rd North Carolina Infantry; 2nd North Carolina Infantry Battalion
Rodes’ Division; MG Robert E. Rodes	Cook's Brigade BG Philip Cook	4th Georgia Infantry; 12th Georgia Infantry; 21st Georgia Infantry; 44th Georgia Infantry
Rodes’ Division; MG Robert E. Rodes	Cox's Brigade BG William Ruffin Cox	1st North Carolina Infantry; 2nd North Carolina Infantry; 3rd North Carolina Infantry; 4th North Carolina Infantry; 14th North Carolina Infantry; 30th North Carolina Infantry
Ramseur's Division; MG Stephen Dodson Ramseur	Lilley's Brigade Col John Hoffman	13th Virginia Infantry; 31st Virginia Infantry; 49th Virginia Infantry; 52nd Virginia Infantry; 58th Virginia Infantry
Ramseur's Division; MG Stephen Dodson Ramseur	Johnston's Brigade BG Robert D. Johnston	5th North Carolina Infantry; 12th North Carolina Infantry; 20th North Carolina Infantry; 23rd North Carolina Infantry
Ramseur's Division; MG Stephen Dodson Ramseur	Lewis’ Brigade Col Archibald Godwin	6th North Carolina Infantry; 21st North Carolina Infantry; 54th North Carolina Infantry; 57th North Carolina Infantry; 1st North Carolina Infantry Battalion Sharpshooters
Ransom's Cavalry Division; BG John C. Vaughn	Imboden's Brigade BG John D. Imboden	18th Virginia Cavalry; 23rd Virginia Cavalry; 62nd Virginia Mounted Infantry; McClanahan's Co. Virginia Horse Artillery
Ransom's Cavalry Division; BG John C. Vaughn	McCausland's Brigade BG John McCausland	14th Virginia Cavalry; 16th Virginia Cavalry; 17th Virginia Cavalry; 22nd Virginia Cavalry; Jackson's Co. Virginia Horse Artillery
Ransom's Cavalry Division; BG John C. Vaughn	Johnson's Brigade BG Bradley T. Johnson	1st Maryland Cavalry Battalion; 2nd Maryland Cavalry Battalion; 8th Virginia Cavalry; 21st Virginia Cavalry; 25th Virginia Cavalry (27th Battalion); 36th Battalion Virginia Cavalry; 37th Battalion Virginia Cavalry; Baltimore (2nd Md.) Light Horse Artillery
Ransom's Cavalry Division; BG John C. Vaughn	Jackson's Brigade BG William L. Jackson	19th Virginia Cavalry; 20th Virginia Cavalry; 46th Battalion Virginia Cavalry; 47th Battalion Virginia Cavalry; Lurty's Virginia Battery Horse Artillery
Artillery; BG Armistead L. Long	Braxton's Battalion Maj Carter M. Braxton	Allegheny County (Virginia) Artillery; Lee County (Virginia) Artillery; Stafford County (Virginia) Artillery
Artillery; BG Armistead L. Long	King's Battalion Maj J. Floyd King	Wise Legion (Virginia) Artillery; Lewisburg (Virginia) Artillery; Monroe (Virginia) Battery
Artillery; BG Armistead L. Long	Nelson's Battalion Maj William Nelson	Amherst (Virginia) Artillery; Fluvanna (Virginia) Artillery; Milledge (Virginia) Artillery
