= Battle of Lynchburg order of battle: Union =

The following Union army units were involved in the Battle of Lynchburg on June 17–18, 1864, near Lynchburg, Virginia, in the American Civil War. The Confederate units are shown separately. The Union force, commanded by Major General David Hunter, consisted of two infantry divisions and two infantry divisions—plus artillery. Hunter's army was repelled by Confederate forces that arrived in Lynchburg right before the battle. Confederate cavalry units delayed the Union approach to Lynchburg, enabling Confederate infantry forces to arrive in Lynchburg in time to defend the city.

== Abbreviations used ==
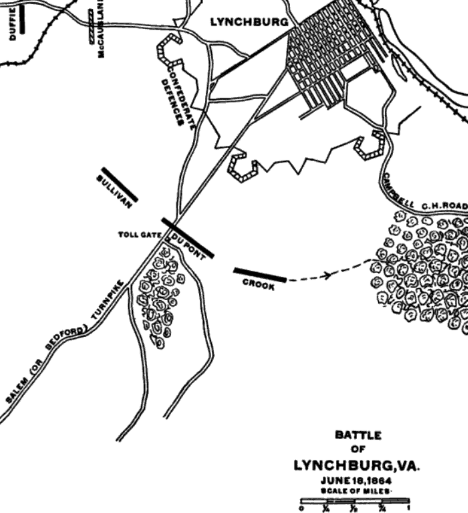
Hunter placed his infantry and artillery across the Salem Pike

Units listed under "Regiments and Others" are regiments unless noted otherwise.

=== Military rank ===
- LG = Lieutenant General
- MG = Major General
- BG = Brigadier General
- Col = Colonel
- Ltc = Lieutenant Colonel
- Maj = Major
- Capt = Captain
- Lt = 1st Lieutenant

=== Other ===
- w = wounded
- k = killed
- det = Detachment
- MOH = Medal of Honor

== Union Army Department of West Virginia ==
Major General David Hunter was commander of the Department of West Virginia.

- Col David Hunter Strother, 3rd West Virginia Cavalry, Chief of Staff
- Capt Henry A. du Pont, Chief of Artillery
- Maj Daniel Harkins, 1st New York Cavalry, Provost Marshal
- Capt William Alexander, 1st New York Cavalry, Quartermaster
- Ltc Charles G. Halpine, Assistant Adjutant General
- Maj Samuel W. Stockton, Aide-de-camp

=== 1st Infantry Division, Department of West Virginia ===
BG Jeremiah C. Sullivan

Brigade	Regiments and Others
1st Brigade Col George D. Wells (34th Massachusetts)	34th Massachusetts Infantry: Capt. George W. Thompson; 116th Ohio Infantry: Col James Washburn; 123rd Ohio Infantry: Col William T. Wilson; 5th New York Heavy Artillery (4 co.): Ltc Edward Murray; Additional Information: Only companies A, B, C and D were present for the 5th New York Heavy Artillery.; The 5th New York Heavy Artillery Regiment was also known as the Second regiment Jackson Heavy Artillery.; The entire brigade suffered 104 casualties from June 10 through June 23. The 34th Massachusetts had the highest number, with five killed and 42 wounded for a total of 47.
2nd Brigade Col Joseph Thoburn (1st West Virginia)	18th Connecticut Infantry: Maj Henry Peale; 1st West Virginia Infantry: Ltc Jacob Weddle; 4th West Virginia Infantry: Col James H. Dayton; 12th West Virginia Infantry: Col William B. Curtis; Additional Information: The entire brigade suffered 57 casualties from June 10 through June 23. The 1st West Virginia had the highest number, with one killed, 18 wounded, and 11 captured or missing, for a total of 30.
Unassigned	2nd Maryland Infantry, Eastern Shore: Col Robert S. Rodgers; 2nd Maryland Infantry, Potomac Home Brigade: Ltc G. Ellis Porter; Additional Information: The two unassigned units suffered 38 casualties from June 10 through June 23.

The 1st Infantry Division had a total of 199 casualties from June 10 through June 23.

=== 2nd Infantry Division, Department of West Virginia ===
BG George Crook

Brigade	Regiments and Others
1st Brigade Col Rutherford B. Hayes (23rd Ohio)	23rd Ohio Infantry: Ltc James M. Comly; 36th Ohio Infantry: Col Hiram F. Devol; 5th West Virginia Infantry: Col Abia A. Tomlinson; 13th West Virginia Infantry: Col William R. Brown; Additional Information: The entire brigade suffered 77 casualties from June 10 through June 23. The 5th West Virginia had the highest number, with nine killed, 27 wounded, and six missing or captured for a total of 42.
2nd Brigade Col Carr B. White (12th Ohio)	12th Ohio Infantry: Ltc Jonathan D. Hines; 91st Ohio Infantry: Col John A. Turley (w), Ltc Benjamin F. Coates; 9th West Virginia Infantry: Col Isaac H. Duval; 14th West Virginia Infantry: Col Daniel D. Johnson; Additional Information: The entire brigade suffered 86 casualties from June 10 through June 23. The 91st Ohio had the highest number, with nine killed and 24 wounded for a total of 33.
Third Brigade Col Jacob M. Campbell (54th Pennsylvania)	3rd and 4th Pennsylvania Reserves (battalion): Capt Abel T. Sweet; 54th Pennsylvania Infantry: Maj Enoch D. Yutzy; 11th West Virginia Infantry (6 co.): Col Daniel E. Frost; 15th West Virginia Infantry: Ltc Thomas Morris; Dismounted cavalry; Additional Information: The entire brigade suffered 205 casualties from June 10 through June 23. The 15th West Virginia had the highest number, with six killed, 54 wounded, and 21 missing or captured, for a total of 81 of the brigade's 205 casualties.
Artillery Capt James R. McMullin (Ohio Light Artillery)	Kentucky Light Artillery, 1st Battery: Capt Daniel W. Glassie; Ohio Light Artillery, 1st Battery: Lt George P. Kirtland; Additional Information: The 2nd Infantry Division's Artillery suffered 10 casualties from June 10 through June 23.

The 2nd Infantry Division had a total of 378 casualties from June 10 through June 23. The 15th West Virginia's 81 accounted for about 21 percent of the total.

=== 1st Cavalry Division, Department of West Virginia ===
BG Alfred N. Duffié

Major General David Hunter reorganized his cavalry effective June 9 while at Staunton, Virginia, splitting the cavalry into two divisions. Duffié was assigned command of the 1st Cavalry Division. The previous cavalry commander was Major General Julius Stahel, who had been wounded at the Battle of Piedmont. Stahel was temporarily assigned duty in the lower Shenandoah Valley. Duffié's instructions for the Battle of Lynchburg were provided by Brigadier General William W. Averell. Effective June 19, Duffié received his orders directly from Hunter.

Brigade	Regiments and Others
1st Brigade Col Robert F. Taylor (1st New York Cavalry)	1st New York Cavalry (Veteran): 15th New York Cavalry: 21st New York Cavalry: Additional Information: The entire brigade suffered 62 casualties from June 10 through June 23. The 15th New York had the highest number, with two killed, 15 wounded, and 23 captured or missing for a total of 40.
2nd Brigade Col John E. Wynkoop (20th Pennsylvania Cavalry)	1st New York (Lincoln) Cavalry; 20th Pennsylvania Cavalry; 22nd Pennsylvania Cavalry; Additional Information: The entire brigade suffered 83 casualties from June 10 through June 23. The 20th Pennsylvania had the highest number, with one killed, eight wounded, and 66 captured or missing for a total of 75.
Artillery	1st West Virginia Light Artillery, Battery B (section) - Lt B.H.H. Atkinson; Additional Information: Battery B had one killed and one wounded.

The entire 1st Cavalry Division suffered 147 casualties from June 10 through June 23. The 20th Pennsylvania had the highest number, with one killed, eight wounded, and 66 captured or missing for a total of 75.

=== 2nd Cavalry Division, Department of Army of West Virginia ===
BG William W. Averell

Major General David Hunter reorganized his cavalry effective June 9 while at Staunton, Virginia, splitting the cavalry into two divisions.

Brigade	Regiments and Others
1st Brigade Col James M. Schoonmaker (14th Pennsylvania Cavalry)	8th Ohio Cavalry: 14th Pennsylvania Cavalry: Maj John M. Daily; Additional Information: In late 1863, the 14th Pennsylvania Cavalry was armed with seven-shot carbines, Colt's navy revolvers, and sabers.; The entire brigade suffered 109 casualties from June 10 through June 23. The 8th Ohio had the highest number, with eight killed, 58 wounded, and 16 captured or missing for a total of 82.
2nd Brigade Col John H. Oley (7th West Virginia Cavalry)	34th Ohio Mounted Infantry: 3rd West Virginia Cavalry(See Additional Information): 5th West Virginia Cavalry: Lt James B. Montgomery; 7th West Virginia Cavalry: Additional Information: The 3rd West Virginia Cavalry served with the 2nd Infantry Division, and its losses are shown with Dismounted cavalry.; The entire brigade (without the 3rd West Virginia Cavalry) suffered 31 casualties from June 10 through June 23. The 7th West Virginia had the highest number, with two killed, 13 wounded, and 8 captured or missing for a total of 23.
3rd Brigade Col William H. Powell (2nd West Virginia Cavalry)	1st West Virginia Cavalry Regiment: 2nd West Virginia Cavalry: Additional Information: By spring 1863, the 1st West Virginia was armed with seven-shot Spencer repeating rifles.; The entire brigade suffered 19 casualties from June 10 through June 23. The 2nd West Virginia had the highest number, with three killed and 13 wounded, for a total of 16.

Artillery	Units
Capt Henry A. du Pont	Maryland Light Artillery, Battery B; New York Light Artillery, 30th Battery; 5th United States Artillery, Battery B; 1st West Virginia Light Artillery, Battery D; Additional Information: Du Point's artillery suffered 55 casualties from June 10 through June 23, and 41 of those casualties were soldiers that were missing or captured. The Maryland Light Battery B had the highest number, with 1 wounded and 25 captured or missing for a total of 26.

== Notes ==
=== References ===
- Duffié, Alfred N. (1902). "Report of Brig. Gen. Alfred N. Duffié...". In Ainsworth, Fred C.; Kirkley, Joseph W. (eds.). The War of the Rebellion: a Compilation of the Official Records of the Union and Confederate Armies Series I Volume XXXVII - Additions and Corrections. Washington, DC: Government Printing Office. pp. 139–145. OCLC 427057.
- Duncan, Richard R. (1998). Lee's Endangered Left: The Civil War in Western Virginia, Spring of 1864. Baton Rouge, Louisiana: Louisiana State University Press. OCLC 940541407.
- Hunter, David (1902). "General Orders No. 28". In Ainsworth, Fred C.; Kirkley, Joseph W. (eds.). The War of the Rebellion: a Compilation of the Official Records of the Union and Confederate Armies Series I Volume XXXVII - Additions and Corrections. Washington, DC: Government Printing Office. p. 508. OCLC 427057.
- Lang, Joseph J. (1895). Loyal West Virginia from 1861 to 1865 : With an Introductory Chapter on the Status of Virginia for Thirty Years Prior to the War. Baltimore, MD: Deutsch Publishing Co. OCLC 779093.
- Not Listed (Official Record) (1902). "Composition and Losses of the Union Forces June 10-23". In Ainsworth, Fred C.; Kirkley, Joseph W. (eds.). The War of the Rebellion: a Compilation of the Official Records of the Union and Confederate Armies Series I Volume XXXVII - Additions and Corrections. Washington, DC: Government Printing Office. pp. 103–106. OCLC 427057.
- Reader, Frank S. (1890). History of the Fifth West Virginia Cavalry. New Brighton, Pennsylvania: Daily News, Frank S. Reader, Editor and Prop'r. OCLC 1336164695.
- Slease, William Davis; Gancas, Ron (1999) [1915]. The Fourteenth Pennsylvania Cavalry in the Civil War: A History of the Fourteenth Pennsylvania Volunteer Cavalry from its Organization until the Close of the Civil War, 1861-1865. Pittsburgh, Pennsylvania: Soldiers' & Sailors' Memorial Hall and Military Museum. ISBN 978-0-96449-529-6. OCLC 44503009.
- Walker, Gary C. (1989). Hunter's Fiery Raid Through Virginia Valleys. Roanoke, Virginia: A & W Enterprise. OCLC 21340468.
