= Battle of Fort Stevens order of battle: Confederate =

The following Confederate States Army units and commanders fought in the July 11, 1864 Battle of Fort Stevens during the American Civil War. The Union order of battle is listed separately.

== Abbreviations used ==
=== Military rank ===
- LTG = Lieutenant General
- MG = Major General
- BG = Brigadier General
- Col = Colonel
- Ltc = Lieutenant Colonel
- Maj = Major

== Army of the Valley District ==
LTG Jubal Early

=== Second Corps, Army of Northern Virginia ===
Division	Brigade	Regiments and Others
Rodes' Division; MG Robert E. Rodes	Battle's Brigade BG Cullen A. Battle	3rd Alabama: Capt. Watkins Pheland; 5th Alabama: Lt. Col Edwin L. Hobson; 6th Alabama: Col. Thomas Lightfoot; 12th Alabama: Col. Samuel B. Pickens; 61st Alabama: Col. William G. Swanson
Rodes' Division; MG Robert E. Rodes	Grimes' Brigade BG Bryan Grimes	32nd North Carolina: Lt. Col David G. Cowand; 43rd North Carolina: Maj. Walter J. Boggan; 45th North Carolina: Col. John R. Winston; 53rd North Carolina: Col. James T. Morehead; 2nd North Carolina Battalion
Rodes' Division; MG Robert E. Rodes	Cook's Brigade BG Philip Cook	4th Georgia; 12th Georgia; 21st Georgia; 44th Georgia
Rodes' Division; MG Robert E. Rodes	Cox's Brigade BG William Ruffin Cox	1st North Carolina; 2nd North Carolina: Col. Hamilton Brown; 3rd North Carolina: Col. Stephen D. Thruston; 4th North Carolina: Col. Edwin Osborne; 14th North Carolina: Col. Ridson T. Bennett; 30th North Carolina: Lt. Col James C. Holmes
Ramseur's Division; MG Stephen D. Ramseur	Lilley's Brigade BG Robert D. Lilley	13th Virginia; 31st Virginia; 49th Virginia; 52nd Virginia; 58th Virginia
Ramseur's Division; MG Stephen D. Ramseur	Johnston's Brigade BG Robert D. Johnston	5th North Carolina; 12th North Carolina; 20th North Carolina; 23rd North Carolina
Ramseur's Division; MG Stephen D. Ramseur	Lewis' Brigade BG William Lewis	6th North Carolina; 21st North Carolina; 54th North Carolina; 57th North Carolina; 1st North Carolina Sharpshooters Battalion

=== Breckinridge's Corps ===
MG John C. Breckinridge

Division	Brigade	Regiments and Others
Gordon's Division; MG John B. Gordon	Evans' Brigade Col E.N. Atkinson	13th Georgia: Col. John B. Harris; 26th Georgia: Col. Edmund N. Atkinson; 31st Georgia: Col. John Lowe; 38th Georgia: Col. James M. Davant; 60th Georgia: Col. Walter B. Jones; 61st Georgia; 12th Georgia Battalion: Capt. George W. Johnson
Gordon's Division; MG John B. Gordon	York's Brigade BG Zebulon York	Hay's Louisiana Tigers brigade (consolidated); 5th Louisiana: Maj. Alexander Hart; 6th Louisiana: Lt. Col Joseph Hanlon; 7th Louisiana: Lt. Col Thomas M. Terry; 8th Louisiana: Capt. Louis Prados; 9th Louisiana: Maj. James R. Kavanaugh; Stafford's Brigade (consolidated): Col Eugene D. Waggaman; 1st Louisiana: Capt. Joseph Taylor; 2nd Louisiana: Lt. Col Michael Grogin; 10th Louisiana: Lt. Col Henry D. Monier; 14th Louisiana: Lt. Col David Zable; 15th Louisiana: Capt. Henry J. Egan
Gordon's Division; MG John B. Gordon	Terry's Brigade BG William Terry	Stonewall Brigade (consolidated); 2nd Virginia; 4th Virginia; 5th Virginia; 27th Virginia; 33rd Virginia; Jones' old 2nd Brigade (consolidated); 21st Virginia; 25th Virginia; 42nd Virginia; 44th Virginia; 48th Virginia; 50th Virginia; Steuart's old 3rd Brigade (consolidated); 10th Virginia; 23rd Virginia; 37th Virginia
Echols' Division; BG John Echols	Wharton's Brigade BG Gabriel C. Wharton	45th Virginia; 50th Virginia; 51st Virginia; 30th Battalion, Virginia Sharpshooters
Echols' Division; BG John Echols	Echols' Brigade Col George S. Patton	22nd Virginia; 26th Virginia; 23rd Virginia Battalion
Echols' Division; BG John Echols	Vaughn's Brigade BG Thomas Smith	36th Virginia; 60th Virginia; Thomas' Legion (dismounted); 45th Virginia Battalion

=== Other ===
Division	Brigade	Regiments and Others
Ransom's Cavalry Division; MG Robert Ransom, Jr.	Imboden's Brigade BG John D. Imboden	18th Virginia Cavalry; 23rd Virginia Cavalry; 62nd Virginia Mounted Infantry; Unauthorized Virginia Cavalry Battalion
Ransom's Cavalry Division; MG Robert Ransom, Jr.	McCausland's Brigade BG John McCausland	14th Virginia Cavalry; 16th Virginia Cavalry; 17th Virginia Cavalry; 25th Virginia Cavalry; 37th Virginia Cavalry Battalion
Ransom's Cavalry Division; MG Robert Ransom, Jr.	Johnson's Brigade BG Bradley T. Johnson	1st Maryland Cavalry Battalion; 8th Virginia Cavalry; 21st Virginia Cavalry; 36th Virginia Cavalry Battalion; 22nd Virginia Cavalry Battalion; 34th Virginia Cavalry Battalion
Ransom's Cavalry Division; MG Robert Ransom, Jr.	Jackson's Brigade BG William L. Jackson	2nd Maryland Cavalry Battalion; 19th Virginia Cavalry; 20th Virginia Cavalry; 46th Virginia Cavalry Battalion; 47th Virginia Cavalry Battalion
Ransom's Cavalry Division; MG Robert Ransom, Jr.	Horse Artillery	Jackson's Company Virginia Horse Artillery; McClanahan's Company (Staunton) Virginia Horse Artillery; Baltimore Light Artillery (2nd Maryland); Lurty's Virginia Battery
Artillery; BG Armistead L. Long	Braxton's Battalion Maj Carter M. Braxton	Allegheny (Virginia) Artillery; Lee (Virginia) Artillery; Stafford (Virginia) Artillery
Artillery; BG Armistead L. Long	King's Battalion Maj J. Floyd King; Maj William McLaughlin	Wise Legion (Virginia) Artillery; Lewisburg (Virginia) Artillery; Monroe (Virginia) Artillery
Artillery; BG Armistead L. Long	Nelson's Battalion Maj William Nelson	Amherst (Virginia) Artillery; Fluvanna (Virginia) Artillery; Milledge (Georgia) Artillery

== Sources ==
- Cooling, Benjamin F. Jubal Early's Raid on Washington 1864. Baltimore, Maryland: The Nautical & Aviation Publishing Company of America, 1989. ISBN 0-933852-86-X
