= List of Confederate units from West Virginia in the American Civil War =

The following is a list of West Virginia Confederate Units which were composed mostly or notably by citizens of the 50 counties of western Virginia which eventually became West Virginia. These units, with the exception of the Kentucky units, are designated "Virginia", as were the Union regiments from western Virginia. After the admittance of West Virginia as a state in 1863, those Union units from western Virginia changed their designation to "West Virginia", while the Confederate units remained "Virginia". Following the names of the units are the names of the counties, in parentheses, which contributed to those units, and does not include neighboring counties of Kentucky or Virginia. The list of West Virginia Civil War Union units is shown separately.

== Infantry ==
- 2nd Virginia Infantry (Berkeley, Jefferson)
- 7th Virginia Infantry Co. D (Mercer, Monroe)
- 13th Virginia Infantry (Hampshire)
- 22nd Virginia Infantry (Boone, Clay, Fayette, Greenbrier, Jackson, Kanawha, Monroe, Nicholas, Putnam, Wyoming)
- 23rd Virginia Infantry Battalion (Mercer, Raleigh, Wyoming) Also known as Derrick's Battalion.
- 24th Virginia Infantry (Mercer)
- 25th Virginia Infantry (Braxton, Hardy, Pendleton, Pocahontas, Ritchie, Taylor, Upshur, Webster)
- 26th Virginia Infantry Battalion (Greenbrier, Kanawha, Mercer, Monroe) Also known as Edgar's Battalion.
- 27th Virginia Infantry (Brooke, Greenbrier, Monroe, Ohio, Wetzel)
- 29th Virginia Infantry (McDowell)
- 30th Virginia Infantry Battalion (Jackson, Mercer, Monroe, Raleigh, Roane, Wirt) Also known as Clarke's Sharpshooters.
- 31st Virginia Infantry (Barbour, Braxton, Gilmer, Harrison, Kanawha, Lewis, Monongalia, Pocahontas, Randolph, Taylor)
- 33rd Virginia Infantry (Hampshire, Hardy)
- 36th Virginia Infantry (Boone, Clay, Jackson, Logan, Nicholas, Putnam, Raleigh, Roane, Wayne, Wood)
- 45th Virginia Infantry Battalion (Boone, Cabell, Logan, McDowell, Wayne, Wyoming)
- 59th Virginia Infantry (Greenbrier, Mercer)
- 60th Virginia Infantry (Braxton, Fayette, Gilmer, Greenbrier, Jackson, Mercer, Monroe, Roane)
- 62nd Virginia Mounted Infantry (Barbour, Braxton, Hampshire, Hardy, Pendleton, Pocahontas, Randolph, Tucker, Upshur, Webster)

== Cavalry ==
- 1st Virginia Cavalry (Jefferson, Berkeley)
- 2nd Battalion Kentucky Mounted Rifles (Wayne, Logan)
- 7th Virginia Cavalry (Berkeley, Hampshire, Hardy, Jefferson)
- 8th Virginia Cavalry (Boone, Cabell, Calhoun, Doddridge, Kanawha, Lewis, Mason, Putnam, Wayne, Wood)
- 10th Virginia Cavalry (Jackson, Kanawha, Raleigh, Roane)
- 11th Virginia Cavalry (Berkeley, Hampshire, Hardy, Jefferson, Morgan, Pocahontas)
- 12th Virginia Cavalry (Berkeley, Jefferson)
- 14th Virginia Cavalry (Boone, Calhoun, Greenbrier, Pocahontas, Roane)
- 14th Kentucky Cavalry (McDowell)
- 16th Virginia Cavalry (Cabell, McDowell, Kanawha, Putnam, Wayne)
- 17th Virginia Cavalry (Braxton, Clay, Harrison, Jackson, Kanawha, Lewis, Mercer, Nicholas, Roane, Wirt, Wood)
- 18th Virginia Cavalry (Hampshire, Hardy, Lewis, Pendleton, Randolph, Tucker)
- 19th Virginia Cavalry (Braxton, Calhoun, Gilmer, Greenbrier, Harrison, Jackson, Kanawha, Lewis, Marion, Nicholas, Pocahontas, Preston, Randolph, Ritchie, Roane, Taylor, Webster, Wetzel, Wirt)
- 20th Virginia Cavalry (Barbour, Calhoun, Harrison, Lewis, Marion, Monongalia, Ohio, Pleasants, Preston, Ritchie, Taylor, Wetzel, Wood)
- 21st Virginia Cavalry (Monroe)
- 23rd Virginia Cavalry (Hampshire, Hardy, Mercer)
- 26th Virginia Cavalry (Calhoun, Doddridge, Jackson, Lewis, Monroe, Pleasants, Pocahontas, Roane, Ritchie, Taylor, Tyler, Upshur, Webster, Wetzel, Wirt)
- 34th Virginia Cavalry (Cabell, Logan, McDowell, Mercer, Raleigh, Wayne, Wyoming)
- 36th Virginia Cavalry (Boone, Braxton, Cabell, Clay, Greenbrier, Jackson, Kanawha, Logan, Monroe, Nicholas, Ohio, Putnam, Roane, Wayne, Wood)
- 37th Virginia Cavalry (Jackson)
- 43rd Virginia Cavalry, Mosby's Partisan Rangers (Jefferson)
- 44th Battalion Virginia Partisan Rangers, formerly Amick's Rangers (Fayette, Greenbrier, Kanawha, Monroe, Nicholas, Raleigh, Wyoming)
- Swann's Battalion of Virginia Cavalry (Boone, Cabell, Logan, McDowell, Mercer, Putnam, Wayne, Wyoming)
- McNeill's Rangers (McNeill's Company, Virginia Partisan Rangers)) (Hampshire, Hardy, Pendleton)
- Thurmond's Rangers (Fayette, Greenbrier)
- Ashby Horse Artillery (Jefferson)

== Artillery ==
- Bryan's Battery, Monroe Artillery (Monroe, Greenbrier)
- Chapman's Artillery, (Monroe-Dixie Artillery, Virginia Light Artillery) (Monroe)
- Chew's Battery, Virginia Horse Artillery (Jefferson, Berkeley)
- French's Battery, Virginia Light Artillery (Mercer)
- Gauley Artillery, Capt. Stephen Adam's Battery (Raleigh)
- Capt. Thomas E. Jackson's Co., Virginia Horse Artillery (Kanawha, Mason, Wayne)
- Kanawha Artillery (Kanawha, Mason, Wayne)
- Lowry's Artillery, Virginia Light Artillery (Monroe)
- Lurty's Company, Virginia Horse Artillery (Calhoun, Gilmer, Greenbrier, Harrison, Lewis, Marion, Upshur, Webster)
- McClanahan's Battery (Randolph)
- Penick's Company, Virginia Light Artillery (Greenbrier)
- Taylor's Company, Virginia Light Artillery (Berkeley)
- Western Artillery (Monroe)
- Wise Artillery (Berkeley, Jefferson)

== Virginia State Line & Other Units ==
- 67th Regiment Virginia Militia (Berkeley)
- 89th Regiment Virginia Militia (Morgan)
- 151st Regiment Virginia Militia (Mercer)
- 167th Regiment Virginia Militia (Wayne. Changed to Union in 1862 by Restored Govt of VA)
- 190th Regiment Virginia Militia (Wyoming)
- 1st VSL, Capt. Daniel Elkins Co, Co. B (Boone)
- 1st VSL. Capt. Greene W. Taylor's Co., Co. A (Logan)
- 1st VSL, Capt. Wm. Dempsey's Co., Co. E (Logan)
- 1st VSL, Capt. Benj. Justice's Co., Co. H (Logan)
- 1st VSL, Capt. John Buchanan's Co., Co. I (Logan)
- 1st VSL, Capt. Robert Lawson's Co., Co. K (Logan)
- 1st VSL, Capt. Geo. Hackworth's Co., Co. F (Cabell)
- 2nd VSL, Capt. Mathias Harrison's Co., Co. H (Cabell, Logan, Wayne)
- 2nd VSL, Capt. William S. Chandler's Co., Co. K (Boone)
- 3rd VSL, Capt. Joseph R. Kessler's Cavalry Co., Co. D (Roane)
- 4th VSL, Capt. William Hensley's Co., Co. G (Cabell)
- 4th VSL, Capt. John E. Love's Co., Co. E (Kanawha)
- 5th VSL, Capt. Lorenzo D. Chambers' Co., Co. A (Logan)
- 5th VSL, Capt. Melvin B. Lawson's Co., Co. E, later part of Rebel Bill Smith's Battn. (Logan)
- 5th VSL, Capt. P.K. McComas Co., Co. I (Logan)

== Guerrilla Units ==
These units were often called "Moccasin Rangers" in the North, but were designated "Partisan Rangers" or "Confederate States Rangers". They operated as such from 1861 to 1862, and were later recruited into the Virginia State Line in the latter half of 1862, and then into the regular Confederate Army in March 1863. The counties from which they were mainly originated are in parentheses at the end of each name.

- Capt. John W. "Big John" Amick's Co., Amick's Rangers (Nicholas)
- Black Striped Company (Logan)
- Capt. P.M. Carpenter's Co. (Logan)
- Capt. Perry Connolly's Co., formerly Capt. George W. Silcott's Co., 186th Regt. Va. Militia (Calhoun)
- Capt. James S.A. Crawford's Co., The Night Hawks (Wood, Jackson & Wirt)
- Capt. George Downs' Co., Co. No. 1 Va. State Rangers, formerly 186th Regt. Va. Militia (Calhoun)
- Capt. Daniel Dusky's Co., formerly Co. C, 186th Regt. Va. Militia (Calhoun, Roane, Wirt, & Jackson)
- Capt. Sampson Elza's Co., Dixie Boys (Randolph & Pendleton)
- Capt. Richard B. Foley's Co., Flat Top Copperheads, also known as Foley's Independent Co. of Infantry, formerly Co. F, 151st Regt. Va. Militia (Mercer)
- Capt. Ezekiel "Zeke" Harper's Co. (Tucker & Randolph)
- Capt. William Harris' Co., Co. No. 7, Va. State Rangers (Wood)
- Capt. W.A. "Devil Anse" Hatfield's Co., formed from the 129th Regt. Va Militia (Logan)
- Capt. Benjamin W. Haymond's Co., Co. No. 8 Va. State Rangers (Braxton)
- Capt. Jonathan Haymond's Co., Co. No. 10 Va. State Rangers (Marion)
- Capt. John E. Hays' Co., Co. No. 6 Va. State Rangers (Gilmer)
- Capt. Absolom Knotts' Co., Knott's Rangers, formerly 186th Regt. Va. Militia (Calhoun)
- Capt. James McCray's Co., Mountain Rangers, Co. No. 5, Va. State Rangers, formed from the 199th Regt. Va. Militia (Webster)
- Capt. Duncan McLaughlin's Co., Webster Dare Devils, formed from the 199th Regt. Va. Militia (Webster)
- Capt. William T. Meador's Co., Co. No. 9 Va. State Rangers (Mercer, Summers, Wyoming)
- Capt. (Rev.) John Elam Mitchell's Co., formerly 165th Regt. Va. Militia (Gilmer)
- Capt. William Franklin Pierson's Co. (Braxton)
- Capt. John Righter's Co., Co. No. 4, Va. State Rangers (Marion, Harrison, Taylor)
- Capt. Peter Sauerbourne's Co., formerly 186th Regt. Va. Militia (Calhoun)
- Capt. James E. Smith's Co., formerly 141st Regt. Va. Militia (Jackson)
- Capt. James W. Smith's Co. (Jackson)
- Capt. William "Rebel Bill" Smith's Co., elements of 167th Regt. Va. Militia, later became Co. D 2nd Battalion Kentucky Mounted Rifles, finally became Smith's Battalion (Wayne)
- Capt. John L. Sprigg's Co., Braxton Co. Rangers, Co. No. 2 Va. State Rangers (Braxton)
- Capt. Philip James Thurmond's Co., Thurmond's Rangers (Monroe, Greenbrier, Fayette, Raleigh, Kanawha)
- Capt. William D. Thurmond's Co., Thurmond's Rangers (Fayette)
- Capt. Marshall Triplett's Co., Co. No. 3 Va. State Rangers (Clay, Nicholas, Webster)
- Capt. Jack Tuning's Co. (Braxton, Webster)

== See also ==
- List of Virginia Civil War units
- List of American Civil War units by state
