= Battle of Fort Stevens order of battle =

The order of battle for the Battle of Fort Stevens includes:

- Battle of Fort Stevens order of battle: Confederate
- Battle of Fort Stevens order of battle: Union
