= Second Battle of Kernstown order of battle: Union =

The following Union Army units and commanders fought in the Second Battle of Kernstown of the American Civil War, on July 24, 1864, in Kernstown, now part of the City of Winchester, Virginia. The Confederate order of battle is shown separately.

== Abbreviations used ==
=== Military rank ===
- MG = Major General
- BG = Brigadier General
- Col = Colonel
- Ltc = Lieutenant Colonel
- Maj = Major
- Cpt = Captain
- Lt = Lieutenant
- Bvt = Brevet Rank

=== Other ===
- w = wounded
- mw = mortally wounded
- k = killed

== Army of West Virginia ==
BG George Crook

Division	Brigade	Regiments and Others
First Division Col Joseph Thoburn	First Brigade Col George D. Wells	34th Massachusetts Infantry; 116th Ohio Infantry; 123rd Ohio Infantry; 170th Ohio Infantry; 5th New York Heavy Artillery
First Division Col Joseph Thoburn	Second Brigade Col William G. Ely	18th Connecticut Infantry; 2nd Maryland Eastern Shore Infantry; 1st West Virginia Infantry; 4th West Virginia Infantry; 12th West Virginia Infantry
Second Division Col Isaac H. Duval	First Brigade Col Rutherford B. Hayes	23rd Ohio Infantry; 36th Ohio Infantry; 5th West Virginia Infantry; 13th West Virginia Infantry
Second Division Col Isaac H. Duval	Second Brigade Col Daniel D. Johnson	34th Ohio Infantry; 91st Ohio Infantry; 9th West Virginia Infantry; 14th West Virginia Infantry
Third Division Col James A. Mulligan (MW)	First Brigade Col Thomas M. Harris	23rd Illinois Infantry; 10th West Virginia Infantry
Third Division Col James A. Mulligan (MW)	Second Brigade Ltc John P. Linton	54th Pennsylvania Infantry; 11th West Virginia Infantry; 5th West Virginia Infantry
	Artillery	30th Battery, New York Light Artillery; 1st Battery, Ohio Light Artillery; Battery L, 5th United States Artillery; Battery E, 1st West Virginia Light Artillery

=== Cavalry ===
Division	Brigade	Regiments and Others
First Division BG Alfred N. Duffié	First Brigade Col William B. Tibbits	1st Maryland Cavalry, Potomac Home Brigade; 15th New York Cavalry; 21st New York Cavalry; 12th Pennsylvania Cavalry
First Division BG Alfred N. Duffié	Second Brigade Col Jacob Higgins	1st New York (Lincoln) Cavalry; 1st New York (Veteran) Cavalry; 20th Pennsylvania Cavalry; 22nd Pennsylvania Cavalry
Second Division BG William W. Averell	First Brigade Col James M. Schoonmaker	8th Ohio Cavalry; 14th Pennsylvania Cavalry
Second Division BG William W. Averell	Second Brigade Col William H. Powell	1st West Virginia Cavalry; 2nd West Virginia Cavalry; 3rd West Virginia Cavalry
	Artillery	Battery F, 1st West Virginia Light Artillery

== See also ==
- Second Battle of Kernstown
