= Peter Bonner (storyteller) =

American storyteller, actor, writer and historian

Peter L. Bonner is an American storyteller, actor, writer and historian best known for his creation of the Gone With the Wind Tour in Jonesboro, Georgia.

== Career ==
Bonner started his career by telling stories in a Confederate Cemetery for tips. He began telling of stories of the Atlanta campaign and the Battle of Jonesboro.

After reading Margaret Mitchell’s statement that “practically all of the incidents in Gone With the Wind are true" Bonner began to document the characters in her book, and developed the "Only Gone With the Wind Tour in the World”. He then wrote a book, Lost in Yesterday, which details the connections and true stories, and a daily tour conducted by the Road To Tara Museum in Jonesboro. In 2006 he earned a Commendation from Georgia Governor Sonny Perdue because his tour had contributed more than 3.5 million dollars in tourism to the local economy.

He has performed in Murder Mysteries, commercials, television programs and corporate events. He has entertained groups as small as a family on a walking tour of historic sites up to 5,000 guests. He has also led efforts to preserve and restore the remains of the original Gone With the Wind sets.

Bonner has been the featured storyteller for the Atlanta History Center, the Atlanta Cyclorama, Underground Atlanta and Stone Mountain Park. In 199 he wrote a tour for Underground Atlanta titled, “Civil War to Civil Rights”. His work with Stone Mountain Park began as a featured storyteller for their Antebellum Jubilee and Progressed through developing their “Hands on History” school program, the first Black History Display in Memorial Hall and writing the narrative for their re-dedication of the Memorial Lawn.

== Bibliography ==
- Official Guide to the Saving Tara Project (2014)
- Lost in Yesterday (2006)
- Provence. Reisen und Geniessen (1998)
