= 29th Virginia Infantry Regiment =

- Flag of Virginia, 1861
- Active: November 1861 – April 1865
- Disbanded: April 1865
- Country: Confederacy
- Allegiance: Confederate States of America
- Branch: Confederate States Army
- Type: Infantry
- Engagements: Battle of Middle Creek; Siege of Suffolk; Battle of Proctor's Creek; Battle of North Anna; Battle of Totopotomoy Creek; Battle of Cold Harbor; Siege of Petersburg; Battle of Dinwiddie Court House; Battle of Five Forks; Battle of Sailor's Creek; Appomattox Campaign

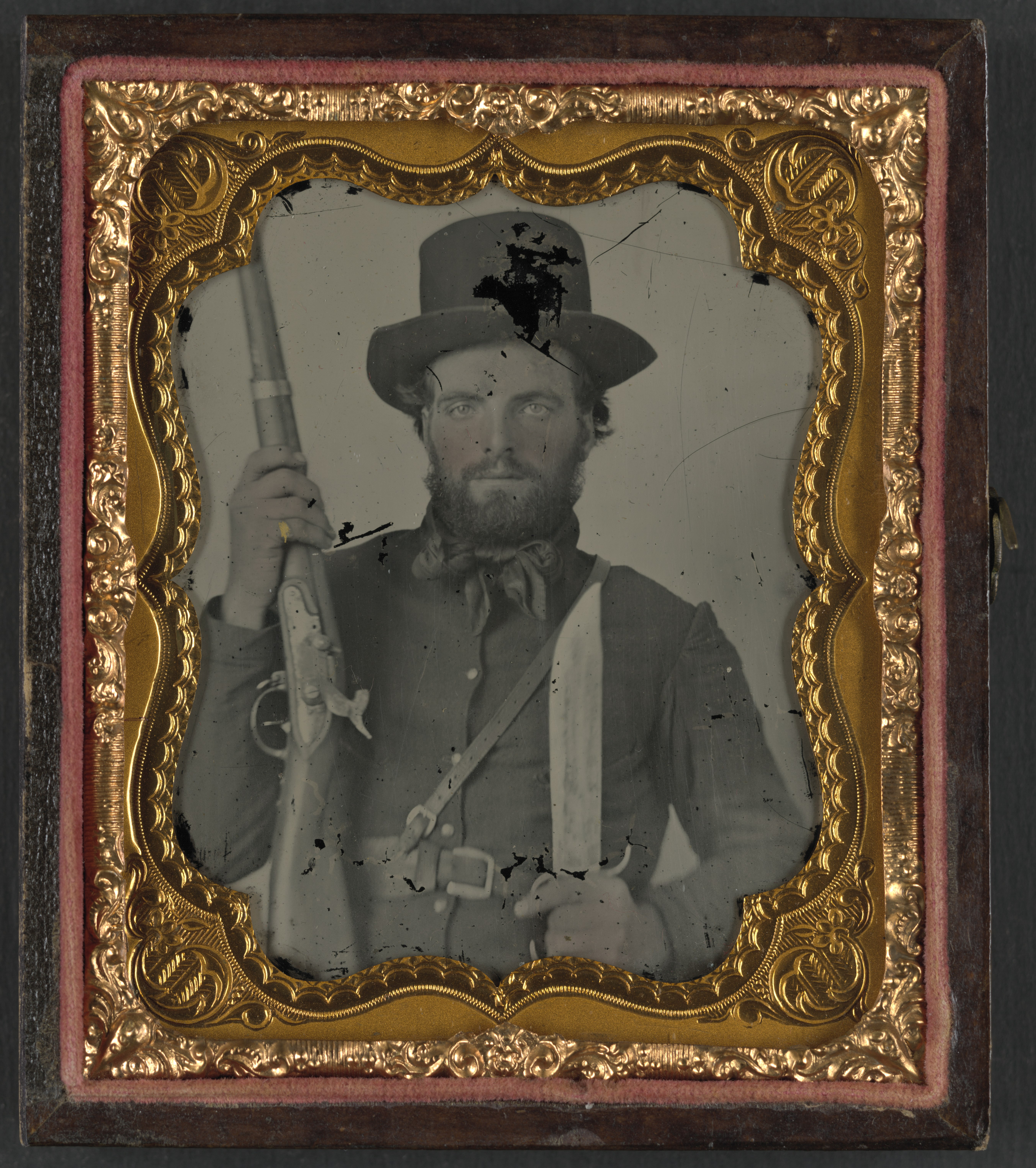
Private Stanford Lea Jessee of Co. A, 29th Virginia Infantry Regiment

The 29th Virginia Infantry Regiment was an infantry regiment raised in Virginia for service in the Confederate States Army during the American Civil War. It fought mostly in western Virginia, Kentucky, North Carolina, and Virginia.

The 29th Virginia was authorized in November, 1861, and was to contain seven companies under Colonel A.C. Moore and three companies at Pound Gap. However, this organization never took place. Moore's five companies from Abingdon and companies raised in the spring of 1862 evidently made up the nine-company regiment. The men were recruited from the counties of Fayette, Raleigh, Mercer, Wise, Russell, Tazewell, Wythe, and Carroll.

It was assigned to the Valley District, Department of Northern Virginia, then moved to Kentucky where it was engaged at Middle Creek. Later it saw action in Western Virginia and for a time served in North Carolina under General French.

In March, 1863, it totalled 732 men. Attached to General Corse's Brigade the unit participated in Longstreet's Suffolk Expedition and during the Gettysburg Campaign was on detached duty in Tennessee and North Carolina. In the spring of 1864 it returned to Virginia and took its place in the Petersburg trenches north and south of the James River and ended the war at Appomattox. Many were lost at Sayler's Creek, and only 1 officer and 27 men surrendered on April 9, 1865.

The field officers were Colonels James Giles and Alfred C. Moore; Lieutenant Colonels Alexander Haynes, William Leigh, and Edwin R. Smith; and Majors Ebenezer Bruster, William R.B. Horne, and Isaac White.

== See also ==
- List of Virginia Civil War units
- List of West Virginia Civil War Confederate units
- Rigdon, John C.. Historical Sketch And Roster Of The Virginia 29th Infantry Regiment. N.p., Lulu.com, 2020.
