= Kanawha Artillery =

Confederate Artillery Division

The Kanawha Artillery was an artillery battery of the Confederate States Army during the American Civil War.

Originally organized in Charleston, Virginia (now West Virginia) in 1861 as Captain John P. Hales Kanawha Artillery, this company saw action in 1861 at the Battle of Scary Creek under the command of George S. Patton, Sr and the Battle of Carnifex Ferry under the command of John B. Floyd. Captain Hale enlisted as a Captain on July 8, 1861, and resigned August 2nd 1861. Lieutenant William A. Quarrier took command and himself resigned on August 21, 1861. Captain Thomas E. Jackson took command of the Kanawha Artillery thereafter. The battery was captured at the Battle of Fort Donelson, Tennessee on February 16, 1862.

The Kanawha Artillery was reformed on May 2, 1863, with many former Kanawha Artillerymen and men from the 8th Virginia Cavalry and Virginia State Line companies, again commanded by Thomas E. Jackson. Then known as Jackson's Virginia Horse Artillery, it was attached to Albert G. Jenkins Cavalry Brigade during the Gettysburg Campaign. The battery participated in the Battle of Gettysburg under the command of Gen. J.E.B. Stuart. In July and August 1863, the battery was assigned to the Horse Artillery Battalion, Cavalry Corps, Army of Northern Virginia. From the fall of 1863 to the spring of 1864, it was assigned as an unattached company to the Department of Western Virginia with Ransom's Cavalry Division and participated in the Battle of Droop Mountain.

After the spring of 1864, the Kanawha Artillery was attached to Lomax's Cavalry Division, Valley District, Department of Northern Virginia under the overall command of Gen. Jubal Early. The unit participated in many battles during the Valley Campaigns of 1864 including the Battle of New Market, the Battle of Cold Harbor, the Battle of Lynchburg, the Battle of Monocacy, the Battle of Georgetown and D.C., the Battle of Folck's Mill, the Battle of Moorefield and the Battle of Fisher's Hill.
