= 12th Virginia Cavalry Regiment =

- Flag of Virginia, 1861
- Active: June 1862 – April 1865
- Disbanded: April 1865
- Country: Confederacy
- Allegiance: Confederate States of America
- Branch: Confederate States Army
- Role: Cavalry
- Engagements: Jackson's Valley Campaign; Bristoe Campaign; Overland Campaign; Siege of Petersburg; Valley Campaigns of 1864; Appomattox Campaign; Battle of Five Forks

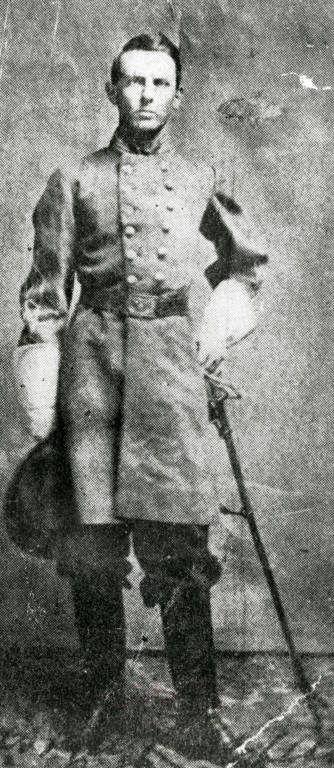
Capt. Lewis Harman, 12th Virginia Cavalry, ca. 1864

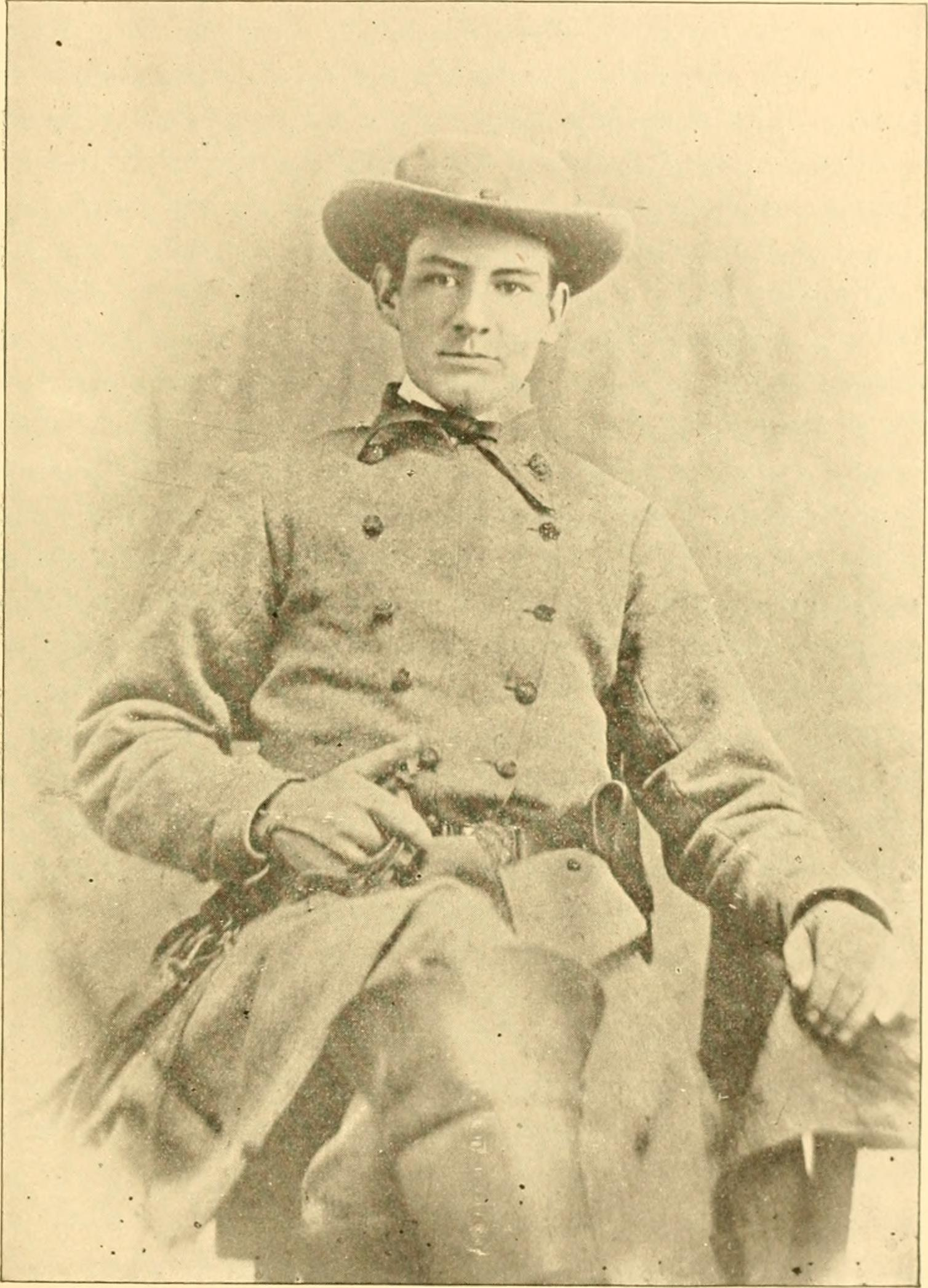
Prvt. William J. Locke, killed in action at Ashland, Virginia, June 1, 1864

The 12th Virginia Cavalry Regiment was a cavalry regiment raised in Virginia for service in the Confederate States Army during the American Civil War. It fought mostly with the Army of Northern Virginia.

== History ==
Virginia's 12th Cavalry Regiment (originally called 10th Regiment) was organized at Conrad's Store, Virginia, in June 1862, with ten companies from the 7th Virginia Cavalry regiment, which consisted of twenty-nine companies at the time.

The unit served in W.E. Jones', Rosser's, and J. Dearing's Brigade, Army of Northern Virginia. It fought in Northern Virginia, in the Maryland Campaign, at Brandy Station, then was involved in various conflicts in the western part of Virginia. The regiment continued the fight at Bristoe and Mine Run, in the battles around The Wilderness and Cold Harbor, and in Early's operations in the Shenandoah Valley.

During mid-April, 1865, it disbanded. The field officers were Colonel Asher W. Harman, Lieutenant Colonels Richard H. Burks and Thomas B. Massie, and Major John L. Knott.

== See also ==
- List of Virginia Civil War units
- List of West Virginia Civil War Confederate units
