= Tyree Stone Tavern =

- U.S. National Register of Historic Places
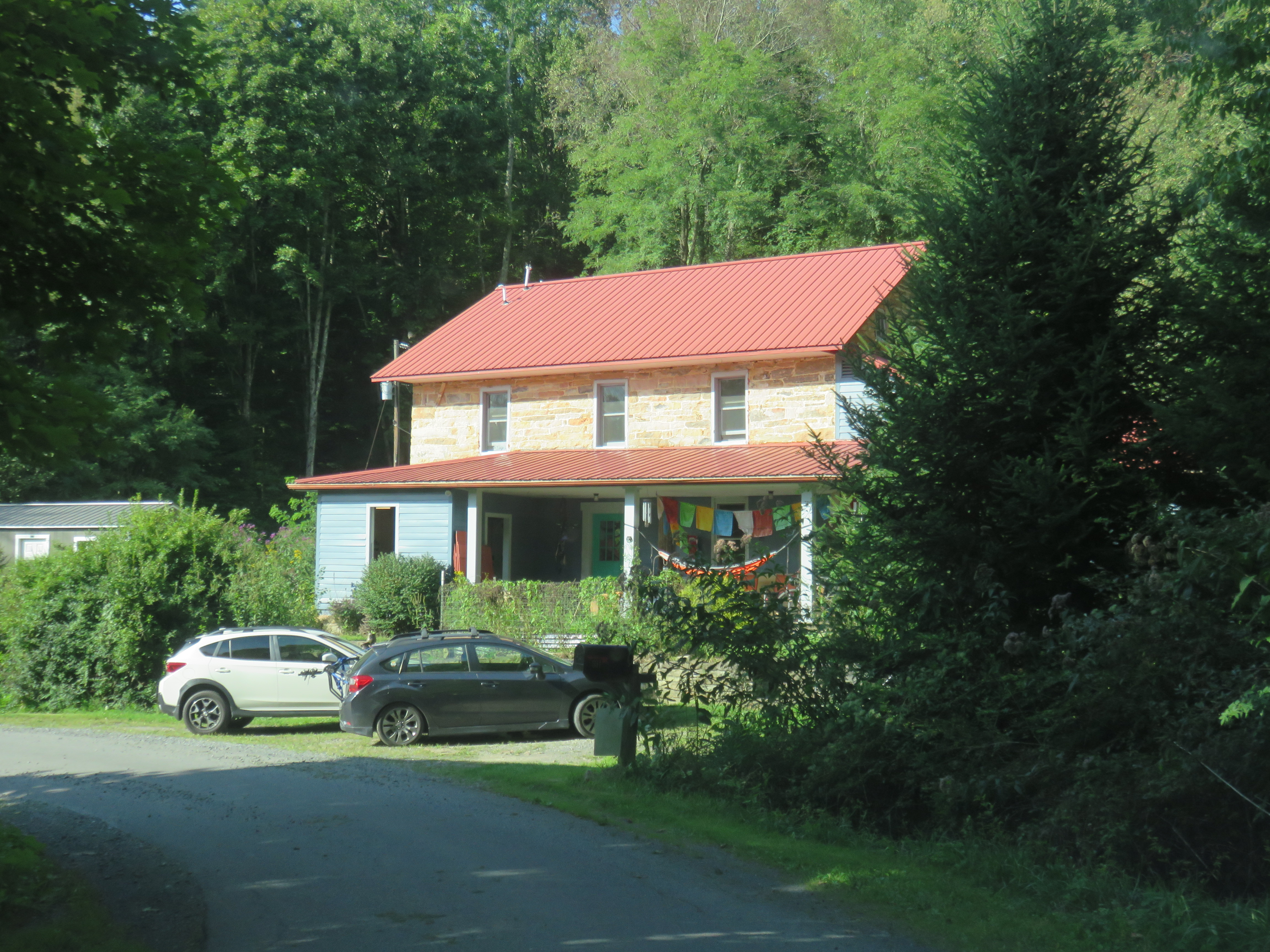
- Tyree Stone Tavern in 2021

- Location within West Virginia Location within the United States
- Location: East of Clifftop off WV 41 on County Route 10, near Clifftop, West Virginia
- Coordinates: 38°0′42″N 80°54′18″W
- Area: 2 acres (0.81 ha)
- Built: 1824
- NRHP reference No.: 75001884
- Added to NRHP: June 20, 1975

Tyree Stone Tavern, also known as the Old Stone House, is a historic inn and tavern located near Clifftop, Fayette County, West Virginia. It was built in 1824, and is a two-story fieldstone building. It measures approximately 40 feet long and 30 feet deep. It served as a stage coach stop on the James River and Kanawha Turnpike.

It was listed on the National Register of Historic Places in 1975.
