= 26th Virginia Cavalry Regiment =

- Flag of Virginia, 1861
- Active: December 1864 – April 1865
- Disbanded: April 1865
- Country: Confederacy
- Allegiance: Confederate States of America
- Branch: Confederate States Army
- Type: Cavalry
- Engagements: American Civil War: Valley Campaigns of 1864

The 26th Virginia Cavalry Regiment was a cavalry regiment raised in Virginia for service in the Confederate States Army during the American Civil War. It fought mostly in the Shenandoah Valley.

Virginia's 26th Cavalry Regiment was formed in December, 1864, by consolidating the 46th and 47th Battalions Virginia Cavalry. The unit served in W.L. Jackson's Brigade and was active in various conflicts in the Shenandoah Valley. It disbanded during the spring of 1865. Lieutenant Colonel Joseph K. Kesler and Major Henry D. Ruffner were in command.

== See also ==
- List of Virginia Civil War units
- List of West Virginia Civil War Confederate units
