= Spring Creek, West Virginia =

- Unincorporated community
- Location within West Virginia Location within the United States
- Coordinates: 37°57′14″N 80°20′56″W
- Country: United States
- State: West Virginia
- County: Greenbrier
- Elevation: 1,893 ft (577 m)
- Time zone: UTC-5 (Eastern (EST))
  - Summer (DST): UTC-4 (EDT)
- Area codes: 304 & 681
- GNIS feature ID: 1555689

Spring Creek is an unincorporated community in Greenbrier County, West Virginia, United States. Spring Creek is located on the Greenbrier River, 3 miles (4.8 km) south of Falling Spring.

An early variant name was Hankins; the present name is from nearby Spring Creek.
