= Confederate Cemetery at Lewisburg =

Historic cemetery in Greenbrier County, West Virginia, US

- U.S. National Register of Historic Places
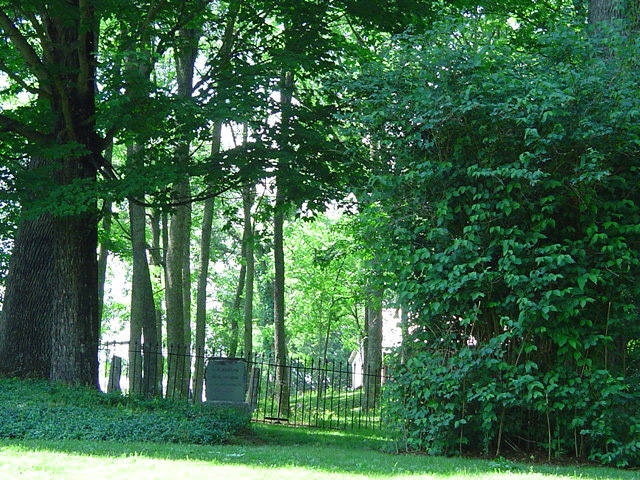
- Confederate Cemetery at Lewisburg, April 2005

- Location within West Virginia Location within the United States
- Location: Maple St. and US 60, Library Park, Lewisburg, West Virginia
- Coordinates: 37°48′14″N 80°26′58″W
- Area: 0.5 acres (0.20 ha)
- Built: 1862
- NRHP reference No.: 87002535
- Added to NRHP: February 2, 1988

Confederate Cemetery at Lewisburg (also known as Confederate Burial Grounds) is a historic cemetery located at Lewisburg, Greenbrier County, West Virginia. The cemetery is the final resting place of 95 unknown Confederate soldiers from the Battles of Lewisburg (May 23, 1862) and Droop Mountain (November 6, 1863). They are buried in a three-foot-high mound shaped as a Christian cross. The cross measures 80 feet, 5 inches in length, with the "arm" extending 53 feet. There are four commemorative monuments, including one installed by the Federal government in 1956. It is enclosed by a six-foot-high wrought iron fence.

The Confederate "monument was erected by the United Daughters of the Confederacy at a cost of $2,800. The monument was originally located on the campus of the Greenbrier College, but moved to its present location, when U.S. Route 60 was relocated."

It was listed on the National Register of Historic Places in 1988.
