= Stamping Creek =

Stream in West Virginia, U.S.

Coordinates: 38°08′16″N 80°10′27″W

Stamping Creek is a stream in the U.S. state of West Virginia.

Some say the creek was descriptively named for the sounds its makes, while others believe former buffalo stampedes account for the name.

== See also ==
- List of rivers of West Virginia
