= William Tecumseh Wilson =

Union Army officer (1823–1905)

William Tecumseh Wilson (October 6, 1823 – June 5, 1905) was a Union Army officer during the American Civil War.

== Biography ==
William Tecumseh Wilson was born in Huntingdon County, Pennsylvania, on October 6, 1823. He served in the Mexican–American War. He was a newspaper editor.

He served as a captain in the 15th Ohio Infantry Regiment, April 23, 1861. He was mustered out of the volunteers on August 27, 1861. He was appointed lieutenant colonel of the 15th Ohio Infantry on September 12, 1861. He resigned that commission on August 10, 1862. He was appointed lieutenant colonel of 123rd Ohio Infantry Regiment on September 9, 1862, and colonel of the regiment on September 26, 1862. Wilson was captured at the Second Battle of Winchester in June 1863 and spent ten months in Libby Prison before being paroled in time to participate in General David Hunter's Lynchburg campaign in 1864. Wilson battled rheumatism in the fall of 1864. He was captured again at the Battle of High Bridge on April 6, 1865. He was mustered out of the volunteers on June 12, 1865.

On January 13, 1866, President Andrew Johnson nominated Wilson for appointment to the grade of brevet brigadier general of volunteers, to rank from March 13, 1865, and the United States Senate confirmed the appointment on March 12, 1866.

William T. Wilson died on June 5, 1905, at Columbus, Ohio. He was buried at Green Lawn Cemetery.

== See also ==
- List of American Civil War brevet generals (Union)
