= 123rd Ohio Infantry Regiment =

- Active: September 24, 1862, to June 12, 1865
- Country: United States
- Allegiance: Union
- Branch: Infantry
- Engagements: Second Battle of Winchester; Battle of New Market; Battle of Piedmont; Second Battle of Kernstown; Battle of Opequon; Battle of Cedar Creek; Siege of Petersburg; Appomattox Campaign; Battle of High Bridge; Battle of Appomattox Court House

The 123rd Ohio Infantry Regiment, sometimes 123rd Ohio Volunteer Infantry (or 123rd OVI) was an infantry regiment in the Union Army during the American Civil War.

== Service ==
The 123rd Ohio Infantry was organized at Camp Monroeville in Huron County, Ohio, and mustered in for three years service on September 24, 1862, under the command of Colonel William Tecumseh Wilson.

The regiment was attached to Railroad Division, West Virginia, to January 1863. Defenses of the Upper Potomac, VIII Corps, Middle Department, to March 1863. 1st Brigade, 2nd Division, VIII Corps, to July 1863. 1st Brigade, 1st Division, Department of the Susquehanna, to July 1863. McReynolds' Command, Martinsburg, West Virginia, to December 1863. 3rd Brigade, 1st Division, Department of West Virginia, to April 1864. 1st Brigade, 1st Infantry Division, West Virginia, to December 1864. 1st Brigade, Independent Division, XXIV Corps, Army of the James, to June 1865

The 123rd Ohio Infantry mustered out of service on June 12, 1865.

== Detailed service ==
Left Ohio for Parkersburg, Va., October 16, 1862; then moved to Clarksburg October 20. March from Clarksburg to Buckhannon, Va., October 27–30, 1862, and to Beverly November 3. Moved to Huttonville November 8; to Webster November 16, and to New Creek November 18. Duty at New Creek until December 12. Moved to Petersburg December 12. March to relief of Moorefield January 3, 1863. Duty at Romney January 10 to March 4, and at Winchester, Va., until June. Reconnaissance toward Wardensville and Strasburg April 20. Operations in Shenandoah Valley April 22–29. Scout to Strasburg April 25–30. Battle of Winchester June 13–15. Regiment surrendered by Colonel Ely, Commanding Brigade, June 15, 1863. Exchanged August 1863. Provost duty at Martinsburg, W. Va., October 1863 to March 1864. Duty along Baltimore & Ohio Railroad from Harper's Ferry to Monocacy Junction until April. Sigel's Expedition from Martinsburg to New Market April 30-May 16. Battle of New Market May 16. Advance to Staunton May 24-June 5. Action at Piedmont June 5. Occupation of Staunton June 6. Hunter's Raid on Lynchburg June 10-July 1. Lynchburg June 17–18. Moved to Shenandoah Valley July 12–15. Snicker's Ferry July 15. Battle of Winchester, Kernstown, July 24. Sheridan's Shenandoah Valley Campaign August 7-November 28. Berryville September 3. Battle of Opequon, September 19. Fisher's Hill September 22. Cedar Creek October 13. Battle of Cedar Creek October 19. Duty at Kernstown until December. Moved to Washington, D.C., December 19; then to Aikens' Landing, Va. Siege operations against Richmond and Petersburg December 1864 to April 1865. Appomattox Campaign March 28-April 9. Hatcher's Run March 29–31. Fall of Petersburg April 2. Pursuit of Lee April 3–9. Rice's Station April 6. Appomattox Court House April 9. Surrender of Lee and his army. Duty in the Dept. of Virginia until June.

== Casualties ==
The regiment lost a total of 187 men during service; 1 officer and 90 enlisted men killed or mortally wounded, 4 officers and 92 enlisted men died of disease.

== Commanders ==
- Colonel William Tecumseh Wilson
- Major Horace Kellogg - commanded at the battle of New Market
- Captain John W. Chamberlain - commanded at the battle of Opequon

== See also ==
- List of Ohio Civil War units
- Ohio in the Civil War
