= 47th Virginia Cavalry Battalion =

- Flag of Virginia, 1861
- Active: April 1864 – December 1864
- Country: Confederacy
- Allegiance: Confederate States of America
- Branch: Confederate States Army
- Type: Cavalry
- Engagements: American Civil War: Valley Campaigns of 1864

The 47th Virginia Cavalry Battalion was a cavalry battalion raised in Virginia for service in the Confederate States Army during the American Civil War. It fought mostly in western Virginia and the Shenandoah Valley.

Virginia's 47th Cavalry Battalion was organized in April, 1864, with four companies. It was assigned to W.L. Jackson's Brigade and skirmished in western Virginia and the Shenandoah Valley. During December the unit merged into the 26th Virginia Cavalry Regiment. Major William N. Harman was in command.

== See also ==
- List of Virginia Civil War units
