= 46th Virginia Cavalry Battalion =

- Flag of Virginia, 1861
- Active: February 1864 – December 1864
- Country: Confederacy
- Allegiance: Confederate States of America
- Branch: Confederate States Army
- Type: Cavalry
- Engagements: American Civil War: Valley Campaigns of 1864

The 46th Virginia Cavalry Battalion was a cavalry battalion raised in Virginia for service in the Confederate States Army during the American Civil War. It fought mostly in western Virginia and the Shenandoah Valley.

Virginia's 46th Cavalry Battalion was organized in February, 1864, with six companies. The unit served in W.L. Jackson's Brigade, saw action in Western Virginia, then was involved in various conflicts in the Shenandoah Valley. In December it merged into the 26th Virginia Cavalry Regiment. Lieutenant Colonel Joseph K. Kesler and Major Henry D. Ruffner were in command.

== See also ==
- List of Virginia Civil War units
