= 20th Virginia Cavalry Regiment =

- Flag of Virginia, 1861
- Active: August 1863 – April 1865
- Disbanded: April 1865
- Country: Confederacy
- Allegiance: Confederate States of America
- Branch: Confederate States Army
- Type: Cavalry
- Engagements: American Civil War: Jones-Imboden Raids of western Virginia; Valley Campaigns of 1864

The 20th Virginia Cavalry Regiment was a cavalry regiment raised in Virginia for service in the Confederate States Army during the American Civil War. It fought mostly in western Virginia.

Virginia's 20th Cavalry Regiment was organized in August, 1863, and was composed of "North Western Virginians." The unit served in W.L. Jackson's Brigade and confronted the Federals in western Virginia and in the Shenandoah Valley. It disbanded in mid-April, 1865. The field officers were Colonel W.W. Arnett, Lieutenant Colonels Dudley Evans and John B. Lady, and Major Elihu Hutton.

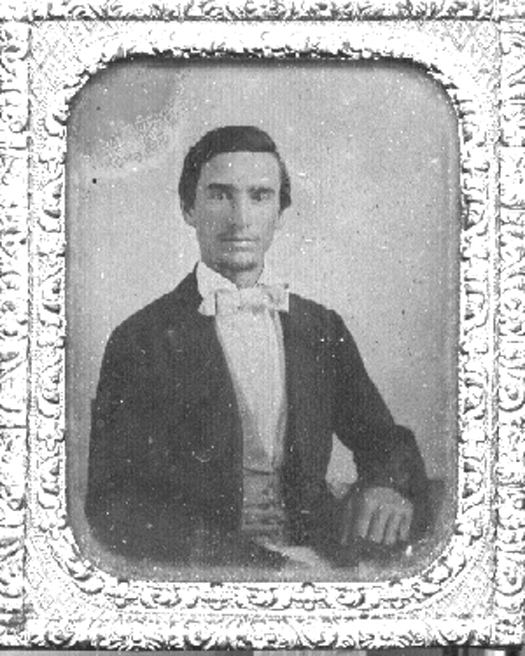
Elihu Hutton, 1860s tintype

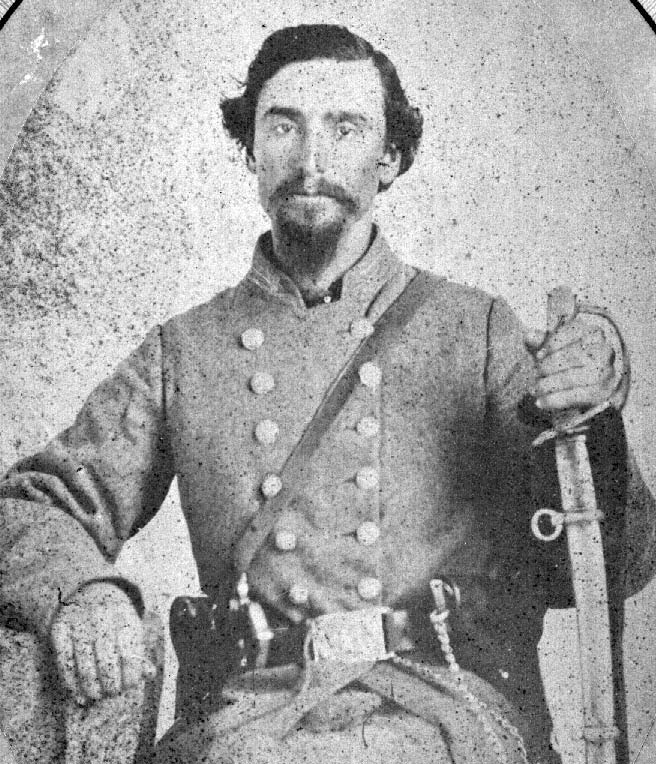
Col. Elihu Hutton

== Companies and officers ==
Sortable table
| Company | Nickname | Recruited at | First (then later) Commanding Officer |
|---|---|---|---|
| A | Company A | Marion County; Monongalia County | Dudley Evans |
| B | Company B | Marion County; Monongalia County | William W. Arnett many formerly from Company D of 19th Virginia Cavalry |
| C | Company C | Randolph County | Elihu Hutton |
| D | Company D | Barbour County | Edward M. Corder |
| E | Company E | Harrison County | John W. Young |
| F | Company F | Harrison County | Asbury Lewis many formerly from Companies A and C of 19th Virginia Cavalry |
| G | Wood County Grays | Wood County; Pleasants County | Paul Neal; John D. Neal |
| H | Company H | Wirt County | Joseph Hayhurst many formerly from Company A and C of 19th Virginia Cavalry |
| I | Company I | Rockbridge County | Henry L. Heiskell |
| K | Company K | Rockbridge County | Ortho Alexander |

== In popular culture ==
In the science fiction short story, Field Test by Keith Laumer, a newly designed and built artificially intelligent superheavy tank called a Bolo Mark XX Model B is assigned to "the 20th Virginia, a regiment ancient and honorable, with a history dating back to Terra Insula".

== See also ==
- List of Virginia Civil War units
- List of West Virginia Civil War Confederate units
