= George Hugh Smith =

American politician

- Born: February 3, 1834; Philadelphia, Pennsylvania, US
- Died: February 6, 1915 (aged 81); Los Angeles, California, US
- Spouse: Susan Thornton Glassell
- Relatives: Isaac W. Smith (brother); Waller T. Patton (cousin); George S. Patton, Sr. (cousin)
- Military career
- Allegiance: Confederate States of America
- Branch: Confederate States Army
- Service years: 1861–1865
- Rank: Colonel
- Commands: 25th Virginia Infantry; 62nd Virginia Mounted Infantry
- Conflicts: American Civil War
- Other work: Lawyer, judge, politician

George H. Smith (February 3, 1834 – February 6, 1915) was a Confederate Civil War veteran and prominent Los Angeles lawyer, judge and politician.

== Early life and career ==
George Hugh Smith was born in Philadelphia, the son of George Archibald Smith and Ophelia Ann Williams. His family moved back to Virginia when he was a child. Smith attended Virginia Military Institute (VMI) in Lexington, Virginia with his cousin George Smith Patton, and graduated in 1853, ranking 6th out of 26 cadets. At first Smith was an assistant instructor at the VMI, but he was admitted to the bar in 1855 and practiced law in Glenville, Virginia until he journeyed into the west and settled in the Washington Territory. In 1860 he returned to the east and practiced law in Baltimore.

== Civil War ==
In 1861 Smith entered the Confederate States Army on June 11 as a private in the Pendleton Rifles, which became Company E of the 25th Virginia Infantry. Elected as Captain on July 1, he and his men were part of the surrender after the Battle of Rich Mountain. Being paroled 2 weeks later he was formally exchanged in March 1862, and was elected as Colonel of his regiment. He was wounded in the Battle of McDowell and received another wound at the Second Battle of Bull Run. After recovering in late 1862 Smith was ordered by the War Department to take several hundred newly exchanged soldiers to Colonel John D. Imboden for service in western Virginia, and was offered the command of them. In January 1863 he became Colonel of the new 1st Regiment Virginia Partisan Rangers, that became the 62nd Virginia Mounted Infantry, as part of General Imboden's Cavalry Brigade and took it into the Jones-Imboden Raid.

In June 1863 the brigade went North, and took part in the Gettysburg campaign as part of Imboden's Command that covered the retreat into Virginia. Smith and his men spent the rest of 1863 and early 1864 scouting and skirmishing in northwestern Virginia. While Smith acted as brigade commander on behalf of General Imboden he was transferred with his (now dismounted) regiment to the forces of General John C. Breckinridge. He participated in the battles of New Market and Cold Harbor. Rushing to take part in the Lynchburg Campaign, Colonel Smith and his regiment were reassigned to General Imboden and mounted again, and took part in the further Valley Campaigns of 1864. When General Imboden was struck with typhoid fever, Smith took command of the brigade on July 5 and reassumed it several times till the end of the war. Being nominated for a promotion to brigadier general by his division command General Lunsford L. Lomax, the nomination was at first vetoed by General Lee. Later on in 1865 General Lee endorsed the promotion, but it was too late in the war to be realized.

== Postbellum ==
When the war ended Smith first fled to Cuba and in 1866 went to try farming in Mexico. He then went to San Francisco in 1868, and then to Los Angeles in 1869.

== Los Angeles legal practice ==
In 1870 Smith joined the law partnership of Alfred Chapman and Andrew Glassell, the firm becoming known as Glassell, Chapman & Smith. Their law practice was confined chiefly to real estate transactions and they made their fortunes in the large partition suits. This law firm acquired and developed the land which ultimately became the city of Orange, California.

Colonel Smith became a California State Senator (1877–1878), Reporter of the California Supreme Court (1879–1882), and volumes 54 thru 62 of California Reports (1881–1884) were issued under his name, Commissioner California Supreme Court (1899–1904), and an Associate Justice of the California Courts of Appeal (1905–1906).

George Smith was a prolific author of California Supreme Court opinions. He was a frequent contributor to the American Law Review. He was a founding trustee and teacher at the Los Angeles Law School.

== Family life ==
George H. Smith's elder brother Isaac Williams Smith (1826–1896), graduated VMI in 1847. He was a captain of engineers in the Confederate Army. After the war, Isaac Smith went to Mexico where he served as district engineer on the Imperial Mexican Railroad from Veracruz to Mexico City.

George H. Smith's younger brother Henry Martyn Smith (1844–1892), was a captain in the Confederate Army. Henry Smith also went to Mexico in 1866 - 1867. In 1868, he went to San Francisco, and taught school at the Oakland Academy. In 1869, Henry Smith came to Los Angeles, practiced law; and was a Superior Court Judge 1883 - 1884.

In June 1870 George H. Smith married his cousin's widow Susan Glassell Patton (1835–1883).

George H. Smith died at his desk in Los Angeles and is interred at Inglewood Park Cemetery in Los Angeles.

== Published works ==
- 1877: Right and Law, A. L. Bancroft & Co
- 1886: The Law of Private Right, A. L. Bancroft & Co
- 1887: Elements of Right and of the Law, Callaghan and Co., 398 pages
- 1893: A Critical History of Modern English Jurisprudence, Bacon
- 1901: Logic, or, The analytic of explicit reasoning, G.P. Putnam's Sons, 266 pages
- The Certainty of the Law and the Uncertainty of Judicial Decisions
- The True Method of Legal Education
- Logic and Its Uses — A Lawyer's View
- Logic, or the Analytic of Explicit Reasoning
- Theory of the State
- The Theory of Jurisprudence

== Notes ==
California Senate
Preceded by John P. West	Member of the California State Senate; 1877–1878	Succeeded by John M. Briceland
