= Glassell =

Glassell is a surname. Notable people with the surname include:

- Alfred C. Glassell Jr. (1913–2008), American businessman, philanthropist and sport fisherman
- Andrew Glassell (1827–1901), American real estate attorney and investor
- Susan Thornton Glassell (1835–1883), the wife of George Smith Patton and George H. Smith, and the sister of Andrew Glassell
- William T. Glassell (1831–1879), officer in the Confederate States Navy during the American Civil War

== See also ==
- Glassell Park, Los Angeles, neighborhood in northeast Los Angeles, California
- Glassell Park Elementary School, elementary school listed on the National Register of Historic Places
- Glassel railway station, Aberdeenshire
