= George S. Patton (attorney) =

American attorney and businessman

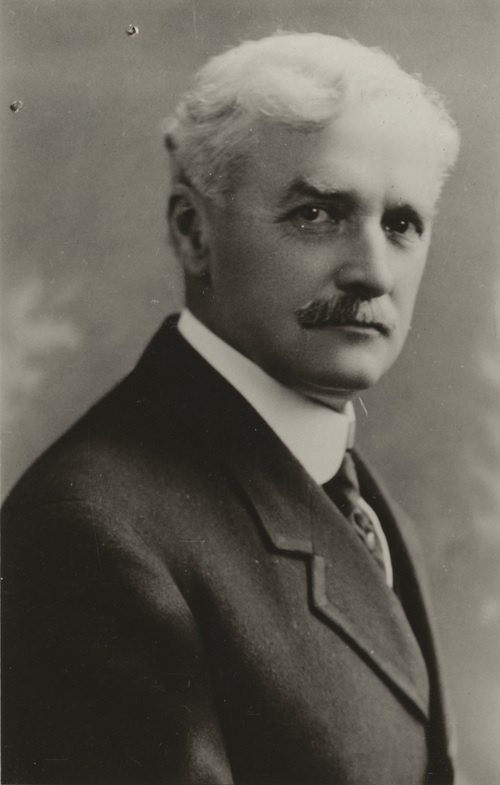
- Patton c. 1916

Mayor of San Marino, California
- In office October 11, 1922 – August 13, 1924
- Preceded by: William L. Valentine
- Succeeded by: Richard H. Lacy
- In office April 15, 1913 – April 16, 1922
- Preceded by: Position created
- Succeeded by: William L. Valentine

Los Angeles County District Attorney
- In office January 3, 1887 – April 4, 1887
- Preceded by: George M. Holton
- Succeeded by: J. R. Dupuy

Personal details
- Born: George William Patton; September 30, 1856 Charleston, Virginia, U.S.
- Died: June 10, 1927 (aged 70) San Marino, California, U.S.
- Resting place: San Gabriel Cemetery, San Gabriel, California, U.S.
- Party: Democratic
- Spouse: Ruth Wilson (m. 1884)
- Children: 2, including George S. Patton Jr. (1885–1945)
- Parents: George S. Patton Sr. (father); Susan Thornton Glassell (mother)
- Relatives: Benjamin Davis Wilson (father-in-law)
- Education: Virginia Military Institute
- Occupation: Attorney

Military service
- Allegiance: United States
- Branch/service: California National Guard
- Years of service: c. 1880s
- Rank: Major
- Unit: 1st Brigade

George Smith Patton (September 30, 1856 – June 10, 1927) was an American attorney, businessman and politician who served as Los Angeles County District Attorney and the first mayor of San Marino, California.

Patton was the son of Susan Thornton Glassell and George S. Patton Sr., a Confederate colonel during the American Civil War. His mother moved to California after his father was killed during the war, and Patton was educated in Los Angeles. He returned to Virginia to attend Virginia Military Institute, from which he graduated in 1877. After studying law at his uncle's firm, he was admitted to the bar and practiced in Los Angeles. He served in local offices including school board member. He was elected County District Attorney in 1887.

Patton married the daughter of Benjamin Davis Wilson, one of California's wealthiest men, and moved with his family to a San Gabriel estate called Lake Vineyard. He was active in politics as a Democrat and made unsuccessful races for Congress in 1894 and 1896. When San Marino was incorporated as a city separate from San Gabriel, he was elected San Marino's first mayor, a post he held from 1913 to 1922 and 1922 to 1924. In 1916 he was the unsuccessful Democratic nominee for U.S. Senator.

A longtime friend of Henry E. Huntington, in 1902, Patton became an executive in Huntington's real estate development company, and played a major role in developing the San Gabriel Valley and other areas of southern California. He died in San Marino in 1927, and was buried at San Gabriel Cemetery in San Gabriel. Patton was the father of two children, including General George S. Patton.

== Early life ==
Patton was born as George William Patton in Charleston, West Virginia (then Virginia) on September 30, 1856. Patton's parents were George S. Patton Sr. and Susan Thornton Glassell.

Patton's father served in the Confederate States Army and attained the rank of colonel as commander of the 22nd Virginia Infantry Regiment. By some accounts, he had been recommended for advancement to brigadier general, but was killed at the Battle of Opequon (Third Battle of Winchester) before the promotion was acted on. His brother Waller T. Patton, Patton's uncle, was a lieutenant colonel in the Confederate Army, and commanded the 7th Virginia Infantry until he was wounded at the Battle of Gettysburg and died several weeks later.

Patton's mother moved to California with her four children in 1866 to live near her brother, Andrew Glassell, and she later married Hugh Smith, Glassell's partner in the Glassell & Smith law firm. Patton was raised to follow in his father's footsteps and in 1868, he chose to have his middle name changed from William to Smith, his father's middle name.

== Education ==
Patton was educated in the public schools of Los Angeles. In 1873, he returned to Virginia to begin attendance at the Virginia Military Institute, taking advantage of a scholarship offered to the sons of Confederate officers who died in service. He graduated in 1877, and was a member of the Beta Theta Pi fraternity and the class valedictorian. He remained at the school for a year as an instructor of Latin, then returned to California to study law at Glassell & Smith.

== Career ==
Patton was admitted to the bar in 1880 and practiced in Los Angeles as a member of his family's law firm, now renamed Glassell, Smith and Patton. According to some sources, he served as the first City Attorney of Pasadena, but the city's records for its officeholders do not include his name.

In 1882, Patton was elected to a seat on the Los Angeles board of education and he served as the board's secretary. Patton also became active in the California National Guard, and was appointed inspector of the 1st Brigade with the rank of major.

In January 1887, he became Los Angeles County District Attorney and he served until resigning in April 1887 because of ill health.

The Patton family later moved to Lake Vineyard, a large landholding in San Gabriel, California, where they grew oranges, operated a winery, and raised other crops.

In 1894, Patton was the Democratic nominee for the United States House of Representatives from California's 6th District but lost to Republican James McLaclan. In 1896, he was again a candidate for the Democratic nomination in the 6th District. After he and another candidate were tied for several ballots, both withdrew in favor of a compromise choice, Harry W. Patton (no relation).

Patton was a longtime friend and neighbor of businessman Henry E. Huntington. Beginning in 1902, Patton worked as an executive for Huntington's real estate development company, which was responsible for construction and settlement in much of the San Gabriel Valley, and extended throughout southern California.

In 1913 the city of San Marino was incorporated separately from San Gabriel, and Patton was elected the first mayor of San Marino. He served from April 1913 to April 1922, and again from October 1922 to August 1924.

Patton was the 1916 Democratic nominee for U.S. Senator from California. Running as a conservative opposed to women's suffrage and other reforms, on November 7, 1916, Patton lost the general election to Governor Hiram Johnson, a progressive Republican.

== Family ==
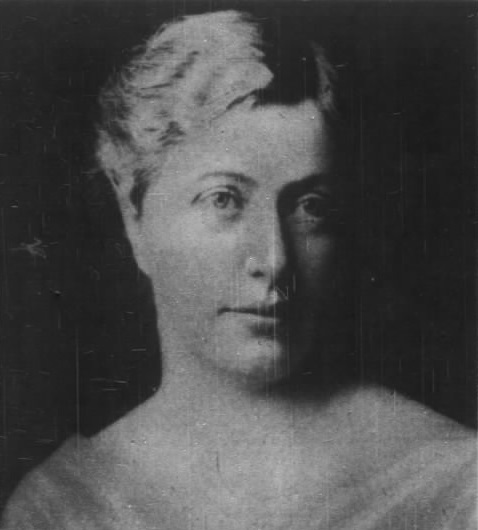
Anne Wilson "Nita" Patton, daughter of George S. Patton

In 1884, Patton married Ruth Wilson, daughter of Benjamin Davis Wilson, a prominent landowner, businessman, and politician, and Margaret (Hereford) Wilson. They had two children, army general George S. Patton and Anne Wilson "Nita" Patton (1887–1971).

== Death ==
On June 10, 1927, Patton died at his Lake Vineyard home in San Marino. He was buried at San Gabriel Cemetery in San Gabriel, California.

== See also ==
- 1894 United States House of Representatives elections in California
- Women's suffrage in the United States#Opposition to women's suffrage

Party political offices
First after direct election of Senators was adopted in 1913	Republican nominee for U.S. Senator from California (Class 1); 1916	Succeeded by William J. Pearson
