= 1916 United States Senate election in California =

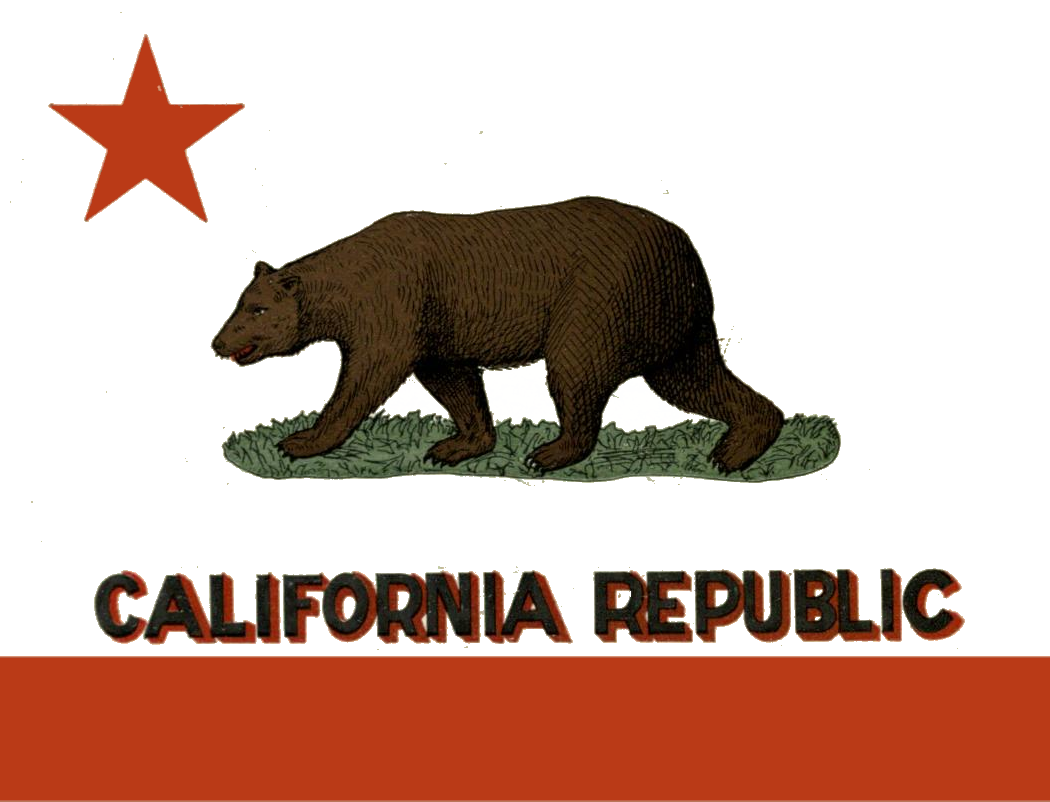
- November 7, 1916
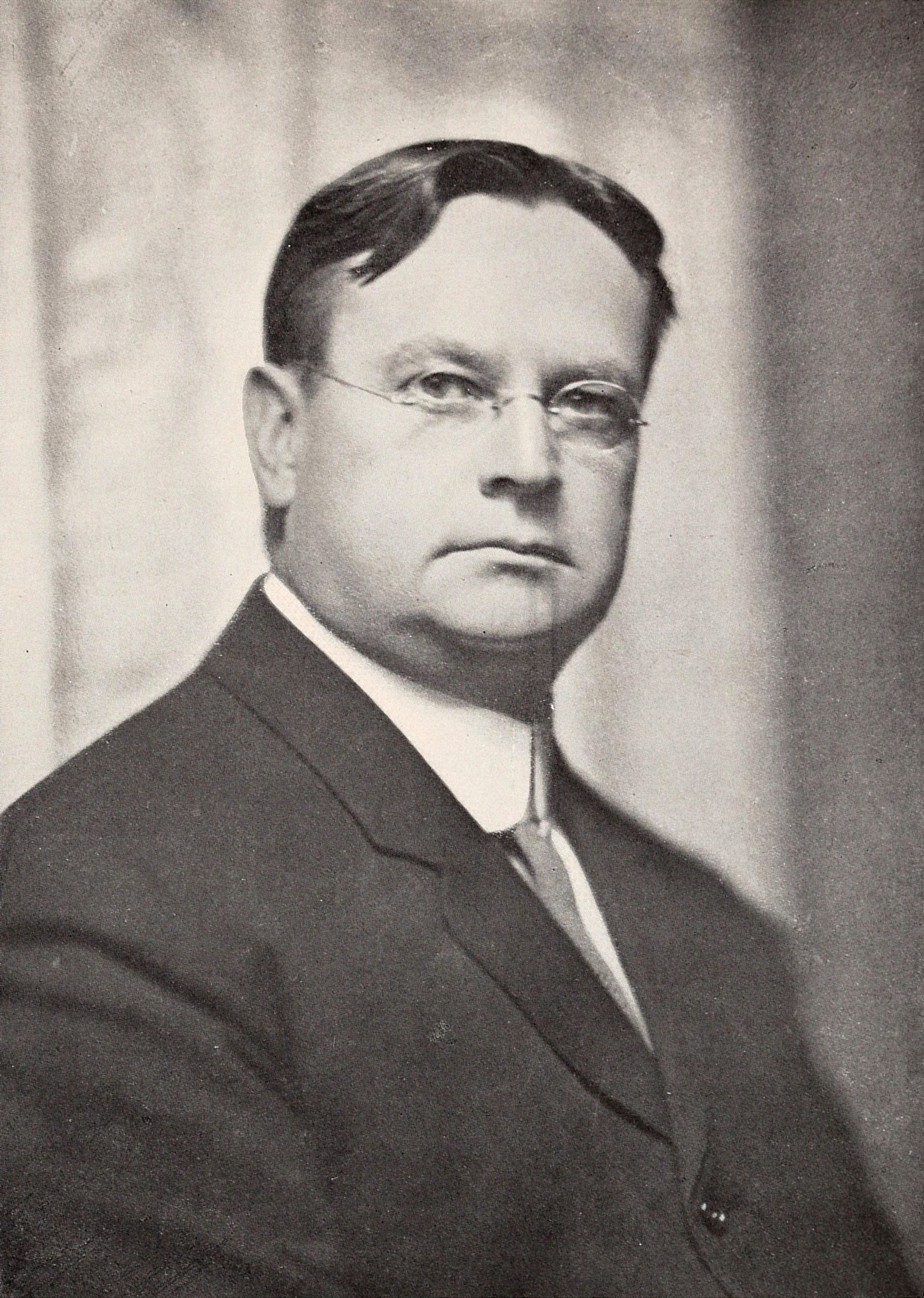

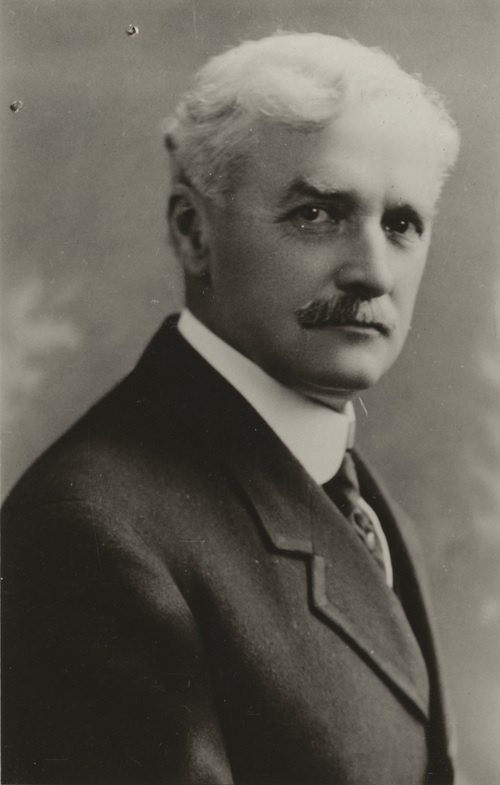

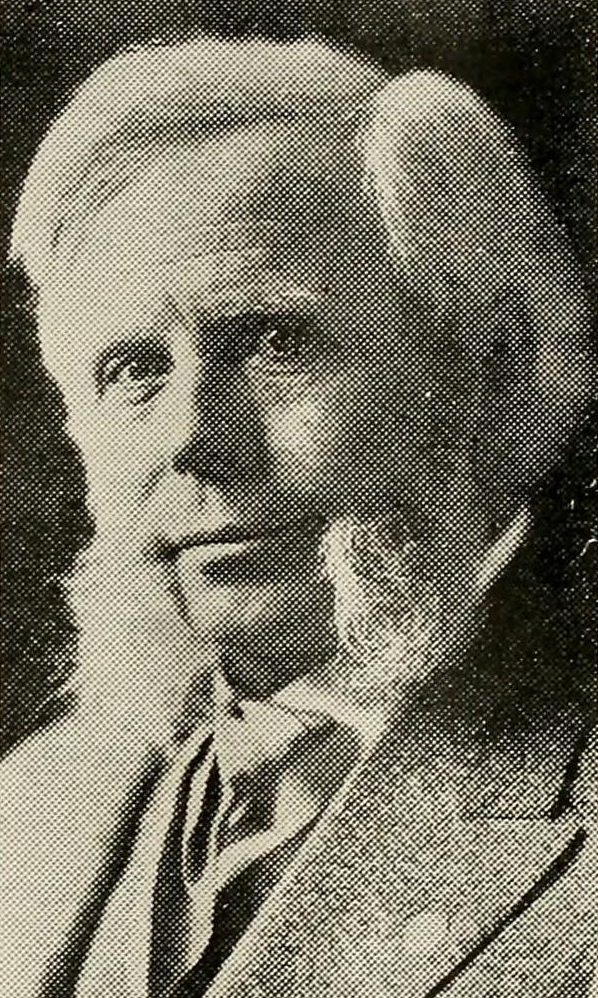
Nominee	Hiram Johnson	George S. Patton	Walter Thomas Mills
Party	Republican	Democratic	Socialist
Alliance	Progressive
Popular vote	574,667	277,852	49,341
Percentage	61.09%	29.54%	5.25%
- County results Johnson: 40–50% 50–60% 60–70% 70–80% Patton: 40–50% 50–60%
U.S. senator before election
John Downey Works
Republican
Elected U.S. Senator
Hiram Johnson
Republican

The 1916 United States Senate election in California was held on November 6, 1916. Incumbent Senator John Downey Works did not run for re-election.

Governor of California and 1912 Progressive Party vice presidential nominee Hiram Johnson won the open seat, defeating Democratic attorney and Mayor of San Marino George Patton.

== Primaries ==
=== Republican primary ===
==== Candidates ====
- Willis H. Booth, banker and philanthropist
- Hiram Johnson, Governor of California

==== Results ====
Primary election results
Party	Candidate	Votes	%
Republican	Hiram Johnson	161,403	52.44%
Republican	Willis H. Booth	146,339	47.55%
Democratic	George S. Patton (write-in)	51	0.02%
Total votes		307,793	100.00%

=== Democratic primary ===
==== Candidates ====
- George S. Patton, Mayor of San Marino

==== Results ====
George Patton was unopposed on the ballot, but Hiram Johnson, Willis Booth, and Walter Thomas Mills received write-in votes.

Primary election results
Party	Candidate	Votes	%
Democratic	George S. Patton	68,871	88.49%
Republican	Hiram W. Johnson (write-in)	7,656	9.84%
Republican	Willis H. Booth (write-in)	1,277	1.64%
Socialist	Walter Thomas Mills (write-in)	26	0.03%
Total votes		77,830	100.00%

=== Progressive primary ===
==== Candidates ====
- Hiram Johnson, Governor of California

==== Results ====
Gov. Hiram Johnson was unopposed on the primary ballot, but Willis Booth did receive write-in votes.

Primary election results
Party	Candidate	Votes	%
Republican	Hiram W. Johnson	16,227	98.16%
Republican	Willis H. Booth (write-in)	305	1.85%
Total votes		16,532	100.00%

=== Socialist primary ===
==== Candidates ====
- Walter Thomas Mills

==== Results ====
Walter Thomas Mills was unopposed on the primary ballot, but Hiram Johnson and Willis Booth received write-in votes.

Primary election results
Party	Candidate	Votes	%
Socialist	Walter Thomas Mills	9,768	95.41%
Republican	Hiram W. Johnson (write-in)	415	4.05%
Republican	Willis H. Booth (write-in)	55	0.54%
Total votes		10,238	100.00%

=== Prohibition primary ===
==== Candidates ====
- Marshall W. Atwood, perennial candidate

==== Results ====
Atwood was unopposed on the primary ballot, but Hiram Johnson and Willis Booth received write-in votes.

Primary election results
Party	Candidate	Votes	%
Prohibition	Marshall W. Atwood	8,077	88.58%
Republican	Hiram W. Johnson (write-in)	846	9.28%
Republican	Willis H. Booth (write-in)	195	2.14%
Total votes		9,118	100.00%

== General election ==
=== Results ===
1916 United States Senate election in California
Party	Candidate	Votes	%
Republican	Hiram Johnson	574,667	61.09%
Democratic	George S. Patton	277,852	29.54%
Socialist	Walter Thomas Mills	49,341	5.25%
Prohibition	Marshall W. Atwood	38,797	4.12%
Total votes		907,900	100.00%

== See also ==
- 1916 United States Senate elections
