= John M. Patton =

American politician (1797–1858)

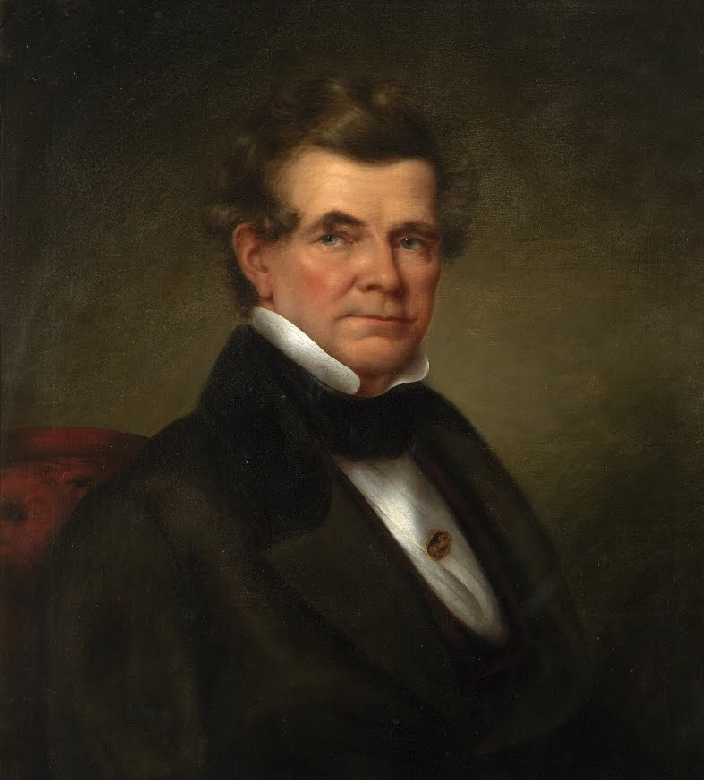

Acting Governor of Virginia
- In office March 20, 1841 – March 31, 1841
- Preceded by: Thomas W. Gilmer
- Succeeded by: John Rutherfoord

Member of the U.S. House of Representatives from Virginia
- In office November 25, 1830 – April 7, 1838
- Preceded by: Philip P. Barbour (11th); Joseph Chinn (13th)
- Succeeded by: Andrew Stevenson (11th); Linn Banks (13th)
- Constituency: 11th district (1830-33); 13th district (1833-38)

Personal details
- Born: John Mercer Patton; August 10, 1797 Fredericksburg, Virginia, U.S.
- Died: October 29, 1858 (aged 61) Richmond, Virginia, U.S.
- Party: Democratic
- Spouse: Margaret French
- Relations: George S. Patton Jr. (great-grandson)
- Children: 10, including George, Waller, James, Isaac
- Parent(s): Robert Patton and Anne Gordon Mercer
- Education: Princeton University; University of Pennsylvania

John Mercer Patton (August 10, 1797 – October 29, 1858) was a nineteenth-century politician and lawyer from Virginia. Patton served in the United States House of Representatives representing two different Virginia districts and was the acting governor of Virginia for twelve days in 1841.

== Early life, education and family ==
Patton was born in Fredericksburg, Virginia, to Robert Patton (1760–1851), an English immigrant of Scottish extraction, and Ann Gordon Mercer (1762–1857), the Philadelphia-born daughter of General Hugh Mercer, who died defending Princeton, New Jersey in 1777. Young Patton attended Princeton University and graduated from the medical department at the University of Pennsylvania in 1818, though he never practiced as a doctor. He went on to study law and was admitted to the Virginia bar. In the first federal census in 1810, the Robert Patton family in Fredericksburg enslaved a person. His father or brother Robert Patton Jr. represented Spotsylvania County in the Virginia House of Delegates during the 1820-1821 session.

J.M. Patton married Margaret ("Peggy") French, daughter of a local family of planters and lawyers. Their children included John M. Patton Jr. (1826–1899), Isaac Williams Patton (1828–1890; who established a plantation in Louisiana after the Mexican–American War), George S. Patton Sr. (1833–1864), Waller T. Patton (1835–1863), Hugh M. Patton (1841–1916), James French Patton (1843–1882), Joseph F. Patton (1844-?) and William Patton (1845–1905), as well as daughters Lucy A. Williamson (who returned to live with the family by 1850) and Eliza Patton.

== Career ==
Patton began his legal practice in Fredericksburg and also enslaved people at his plantation in nearby Spotsylvania County. Robert Patton Jr. (either his father or elder brother) represented Spotsylvania County in the House of Delegates in 1820–1821 and enslaved 11 people in the 1810 census and 12 people in the 1820 census. In the 1830 federal census, John M. Patton enslaved nine people (two boys and a girl under 10, as well as two men under 35, two women under 35, and two women between 35 and 55. He enslaved a similar number of people in Richmond in the last census during his lifetime—an older man, two older women, a 40-year-old Black woman, a 26-year-old mulatto woman, and mulatto boys aged 15, 10 and 2 years old. He may also have enslaved two people in Pittsylvania County, where his daughter Eliza had married John Gilmer. [Robert Patton enslaved 8 people, of whom only 2 were children in Culpeper County west of Spotsylvania in 1850]

Meanwhile, voters in the Fredericksburg and Spotsylvania area elected Patton as a Jacksonian and Democrat to the United States House of Representatives initially to fill a vacancy in 1830, but he won re-election twice and served until 1838. He became chairman of the Committee on Territories from 1835 to 1839. In 1834, Virginia legislators almost elected him as the state's attorney general, but western Virginia lawyer Sidney Smith Baxter was appointed by a four-vote margin.

After leaving Congress, Virginia legislators appointed Patton the senior councilor of the Virginia Council of State and, therefore, the Lieutenant Governor of Virginia.

After Governor Thomas W. Gilmer resigned in 1841, Patton served as Acting Governor of Virginia for twelve days until his term ended on March 31, 1841.

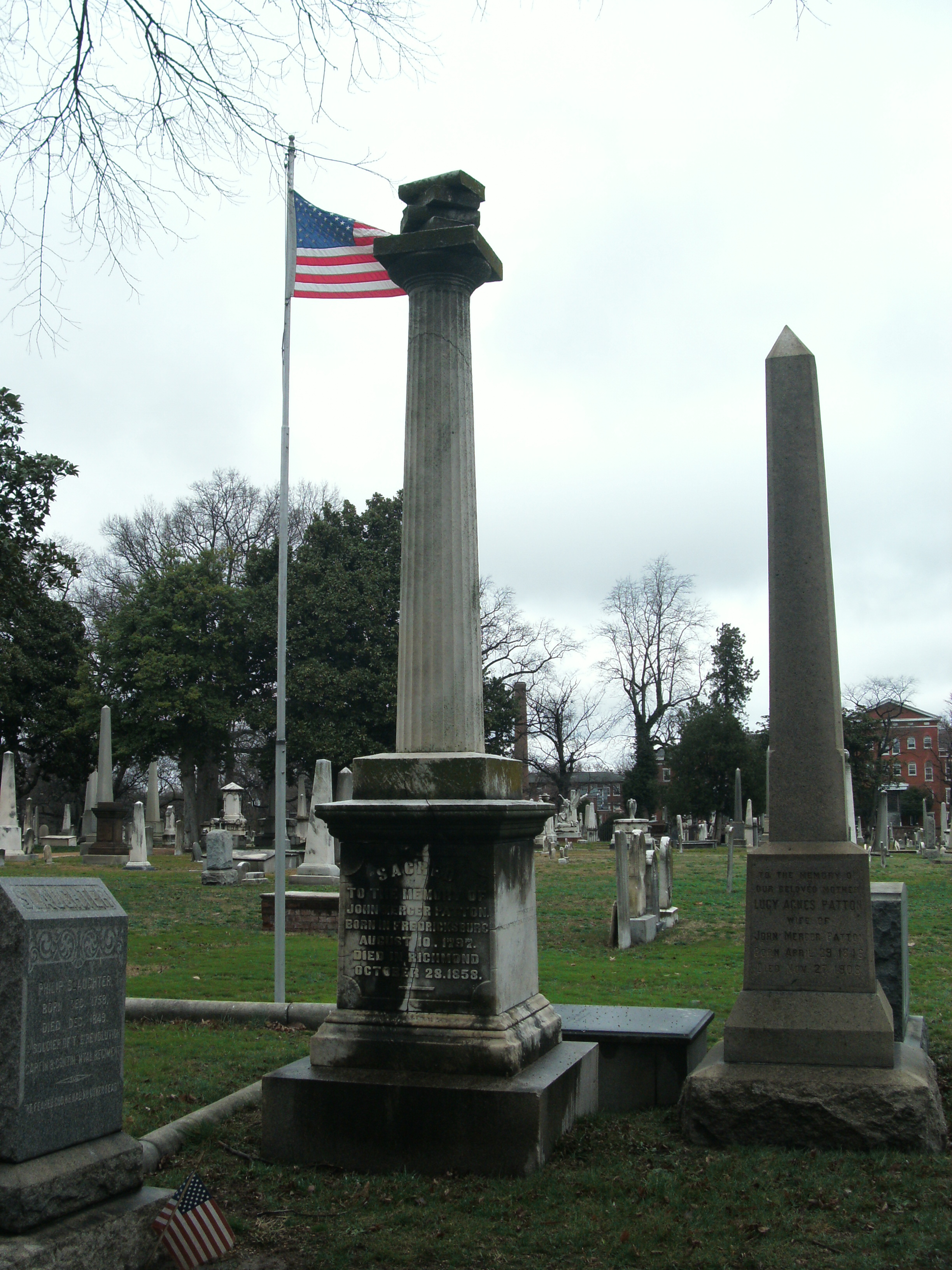
Grave at Shockoe Hill Cemetery

Patton returned to his private legal practice in Richmond, including work on a revision of the Code of Virginia, which he and Conway Robinson published in 1849.

== Death and legacy ==
Patton died in Richmond, Virginia, on October 29, 1858. He was interred at Shockoe Hill Cemetery. His sons James French Patton, Isaac Williams Patton, George S. Patton Sr., Hugh M. Patton, and Waller T. Patton all became Confederate States Army officers (and William M. Patton fought with VMI cadets). Col. W. T. Patton died leading his men at the Battle of Gettysburg and Col. George S. Patton died during the Third Battle of Winchester, but the other sons survived the war. Isaac Williams Patton (who had moved to Louisiana to operate a plantation before the war) became mayor of New Orleans, Louisiana, in 1878. Hugh M. Patton briefly served as clerk of the Virginia Senate, James French Patton also became a lawyer and briefly served on the West Virginia Supreme Court, and William McFarland Patton became a professor of civil engineering at VMI (where most of his brothers had also graduated). His grandson George S. Patton became a California attorney, and his great-grandson was World War II general George S. Patton Jr.

U.S. House of Representatives
Preceded by Philip P. Barbour	Member of the U.S. House of Representatives from Virginia's 11th congressional district November 25, 1830 – March 3, 1833	Succeeded by Andrew Stevenson
Preceded by Joseph Chinn	Member of the U.S. House of Representatives from Virginia's 13th congressional district March 4, 1833 – April 7, 1838 (obsolete district)	Succeeded by Linn Banks
Political offices
Preceded by Thomas W. Gilmer; Governor	Acting Governor of Virginia; March 20, 1841 – March 31, 1841	Succeeded by John Rutherfoord; Acting Governor
