= 1922 United States Senate election in California =

American state election

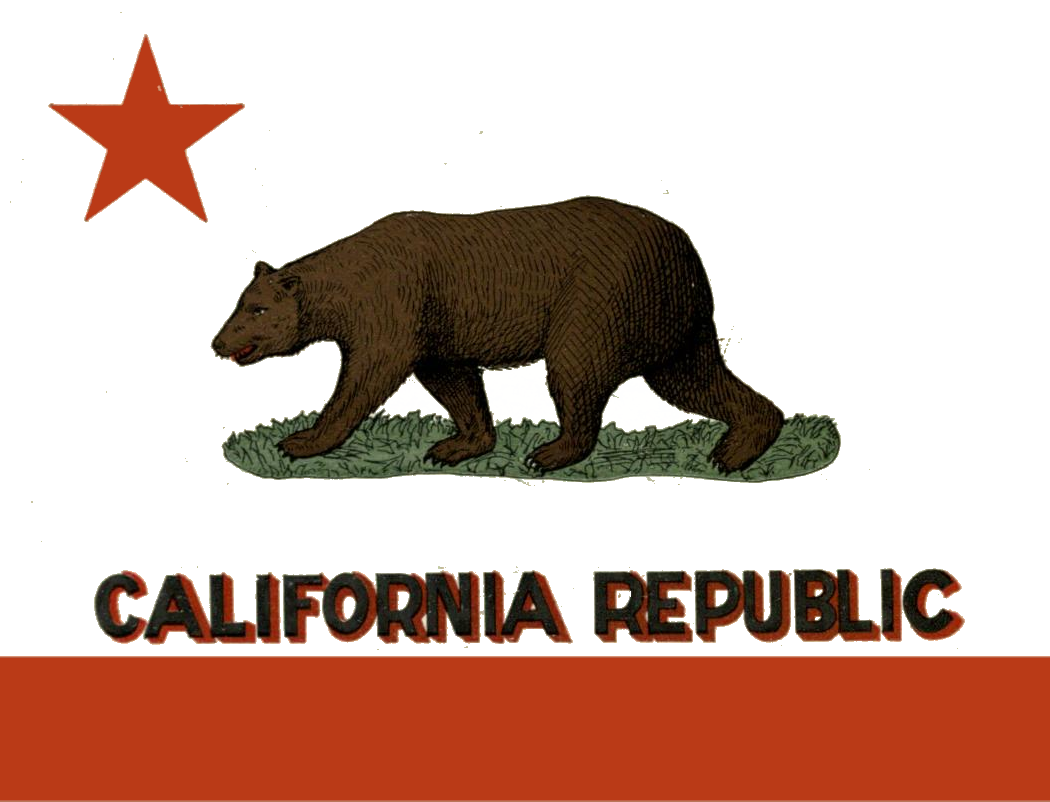
- November 7, 1922
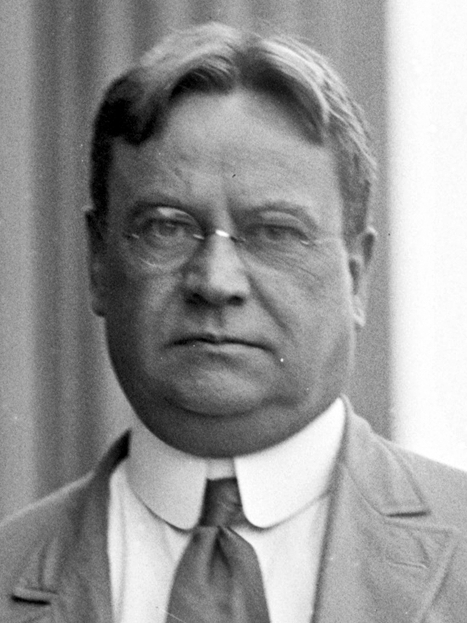

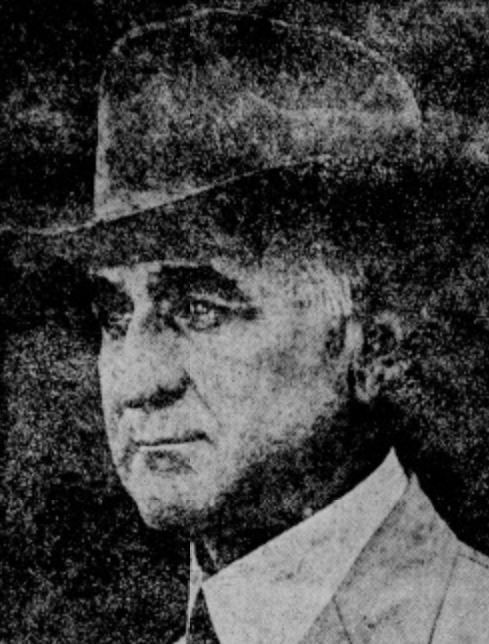

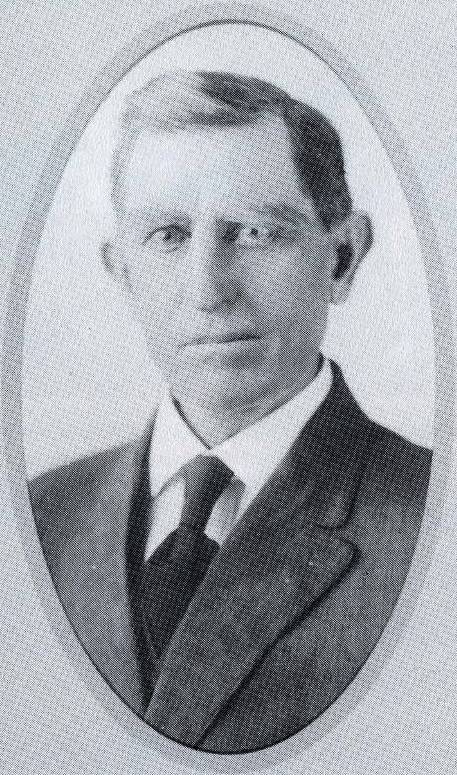

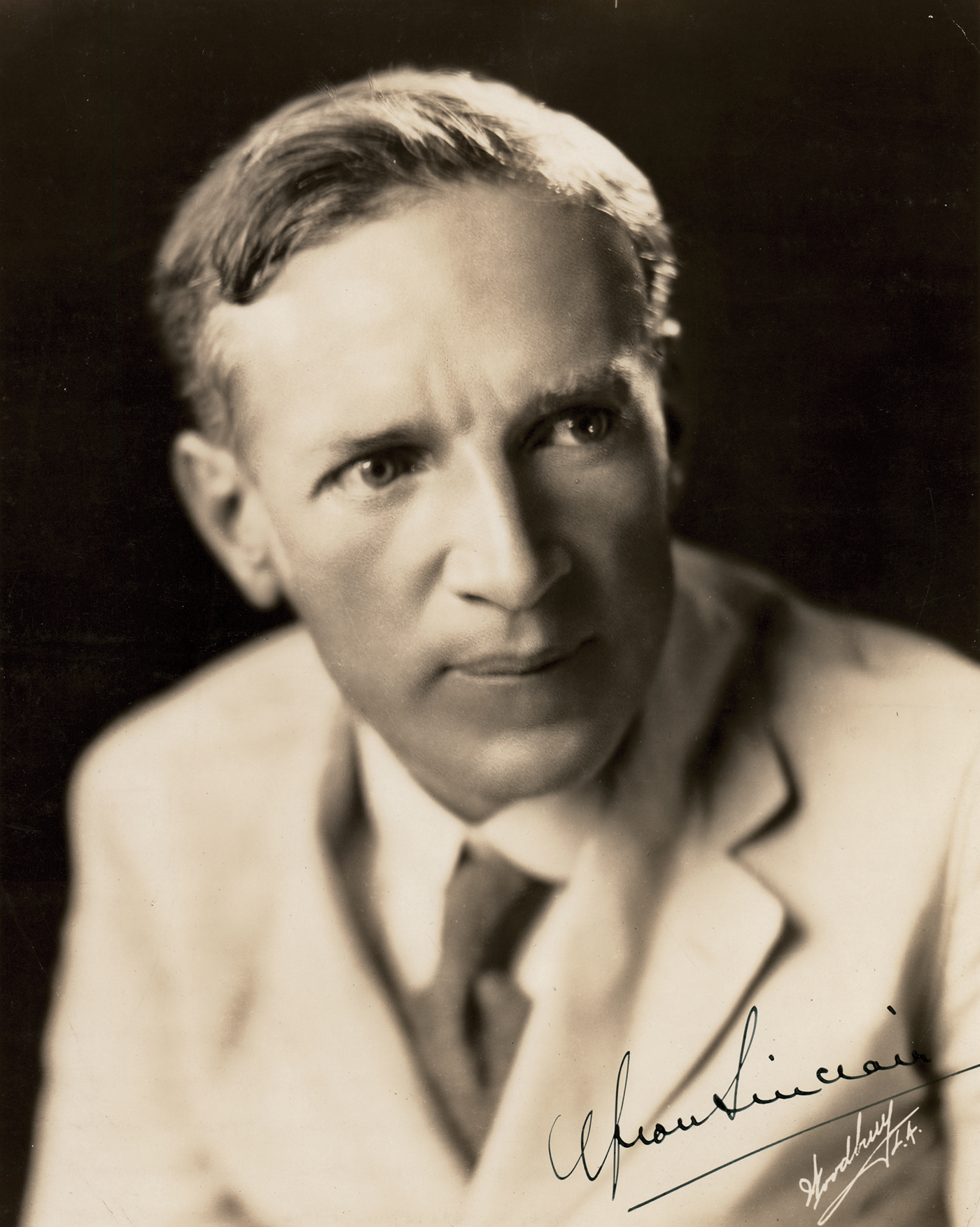
| Nominee | Hiram Johnson | William J. Pearson |
| Party | Republican | Democratic |
| Popular vote | 564,422 | 215,748 |
| Percentage | 62.17% | 23.76% |
| Nominee | Henry Clay Needham | Upton Sinclair |
| Party | Prohibition | Socialist |
| Popular vote | 70,748 | 56,982 |
| Percentage | 7.79% | 6.28% |
- County results Johnson: 40–50% 50–60% 60–70% 70–80% 80–90%
U.S. senator before election
Hiram Johnson
Republican
Elected U.S. Senator
Hiram Johnson
Republican

The 1922 United States Senate election in California was held on November 7, 1922. Incumbent Republican Senator Hiram Johnson was re-elected to his second term in office.

His greatest challenge came from fellow Republican Charles C. Moore, a citrus and olive rancher.

== Republican primary ==
=== Candidates ===
- Hiram Johnson, incumbent Senator
- Charles C. Moore, businessman and agriculturalist

=== Results ===
Primary election results
| Party | Candidate | Votes | % |
|---|---|---|---|
| Republican | Hiram Johnson (incumbent) | 313,539 | 56.71% |
| Republican | Charles C. Moore | 239,320 | 43.29% |
| Total votes | | 552,859 | 100.00% |

== Democratic primary ==
=== Candidates ===
- William J. Pearson, farmer

=== Results ===
William J. Pearson was unopposed on the ballot, but some primary voters wrote in Republicans Hiram Johnson or Charles C. Moore.

Primary election results
| Party | Candidate | Votes | % |
|---|---|---|---|
| Democratic | William J. Pearson | 85,393 | 93.00% |
| Republican | Hiram W. Johnson (incumbent) (write-in) | 3,760 | 4.10% |
| Republican | Charles C. Moore (write-in) | 2,666 | 2.90% |
| Total votes | | 97,442 | 100.00% |

== General election ==
=== Candidates ===
- Hiram Johnson, incumbent Senator (Republican)
- Henry Clay Needham, Los Angeles County Supervisor and businessman (Prohibition)
- William J. Pearson, farmer (Democratic)
- Upton Sinclair, journalist and novelist (Socialist)

=== Results ===
1922 United States Senate election in California
| Party | Candidate | Votes | % | ±% |
|---|---|---|---|---|
| Republican | Hiram Johnson (incumbent) | 564,422 | 62.17% | ▲1.08 |
| Democratic | William J. Pearson | 215,748 | 23.76% | ▼5.78 |
| Prohibition | Henry Clay Needham | 70,748 | 7.79% | ▲3.67 |
| Socialist | Upton Sinclair | 56,982 | 6.28% | ▲1.03 |
| Total votes | | 907,900 | 100.00% | |

== See also ==
- 1922 United States Senate elections
