= Hiram Johnson =

American politician (1866-1945)

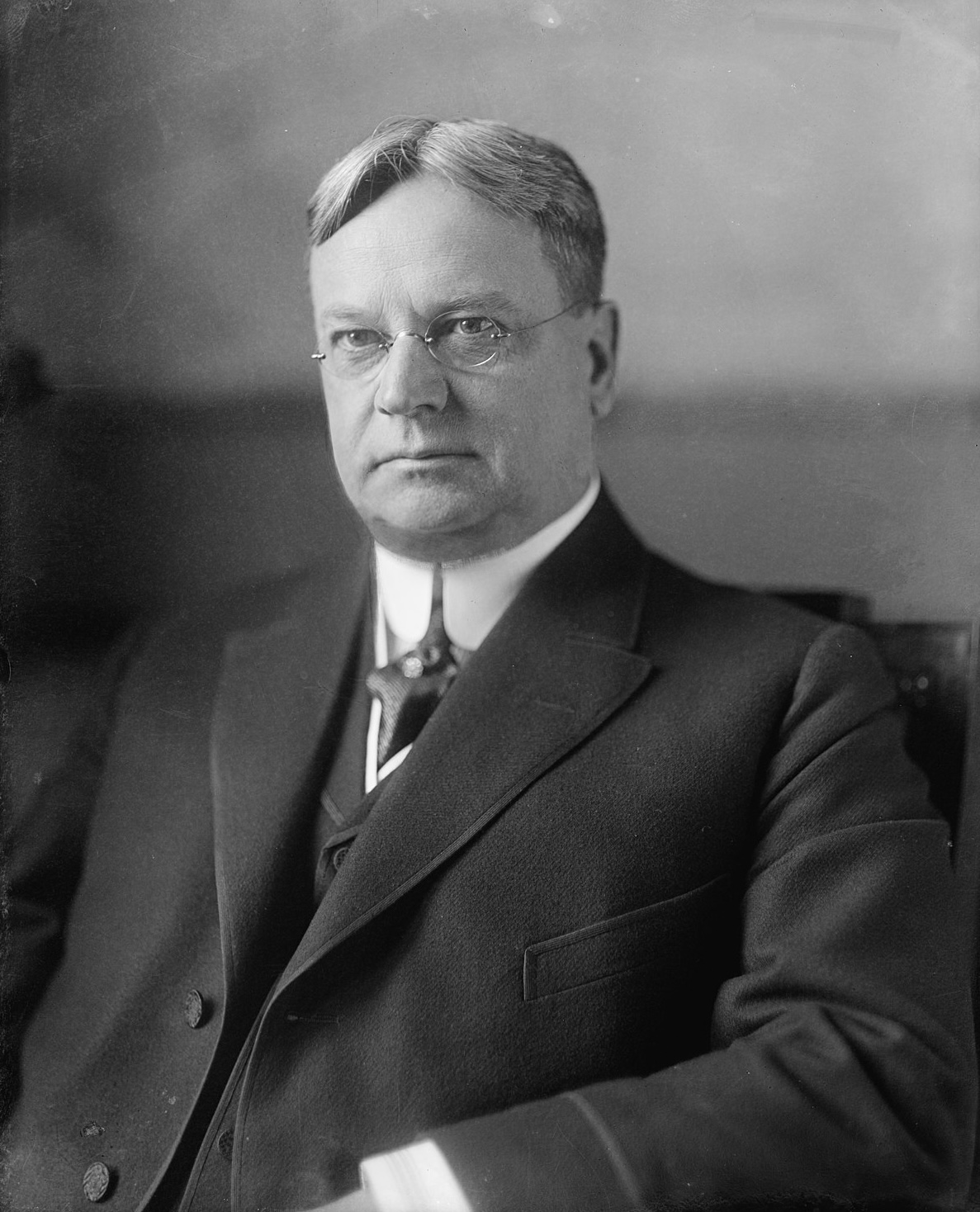
- Johnson, c. 1926

United States Senator from California
- In office March 16, 1917 – August 6, 1945
- Preceded by: John D. Works
- Succeeded by: William Knowland
Senate positions
Chair of the Senate Commerce Committee
In office March 4, 1929 – March 4, 1933
Preceded by	Wesley Jones
Succeeded by	Hubert D. Stephens
Chair of the Senate Immigration Committee
In office March 4, 1923 – March 4, 1929
Preceded by	LeBaron B. Colt
Succeeded by	Arthur R. Gould
Chair of the Senate Patents Committee
In office March 4, 1921 – March 4, 1923
Preceded by	George W. Norris
Succeeded by	Richard P. Ernst
Chair of the Senate Cuban Relations Committee
In office March 4, 1919 – March 4, 1921
Preceded by	Oscar Underwood
Succeeded by	Committee disbanded

23rd Governor of California
- In office January 3, 1911 – March 15, 1917
- Lieutenant: Albert Wallace; John Morton Eshleman; William Stephens
- Preceded by: James Gillett
- Succeeded by: William Stephens

Personal details
- Born: Hiram Warren Johnson; September 2, 1866 Sacramento, California, U.S.
- Died: August 6, 1945 (aged 78) Bethesda, Maryland, U.S.
- Resting place: Cypress Lawn Memorial Park
- Party: Republican
- Other political affiliations: Progressive (1912–1916)
- Spouse: Minne McNeal (1886–1945)
- Children: 2
- Parents: Grove L. Johnson (father); Mabel Ann Williamson De Montfredy (mother)
- Education: Heald's Business College; University of California, Berkeley

Hiram Warren Johnson (September 2, 1866 – August 6, 1945) was an American attorney and politician who served as the 23rd governor of California from 1911 to 1917 and represented California in the U.S. Senate for five terms from 1917 to 1945. Johnson achieved national prominence in the early 20th century as a leading progressive and ran for vice president on Theodore Roosevelt's Progressive ticket in the 1912 presidential election. As a U.S. senator, Johnson voted for American entry into World War I and was later a critic of the foreign policy of both Woodrow Wilson and Franklin D. Roosevelt. Johnson was the only governor of his state from 1856 until 1943 to serve more than one term.

Johnson was born in 1866 and worked as a stenographer and reporter before embarking on a legal career in his hometown of Sacramento. After he moved to San Francisco, he worked as an assistant district attorney and gained statewide renown for his prosecutions of public corruption. On the back of this popularity, Johnson won the 1910 California gubernatorial election with the backing of the progressive Lincoln–Roosevelt League. He instituted several progressive reforms, establishing a railroad commission and introducing aspects of direct democracy, such as the power to recall state officials. Having joined with Theodore Roosevelt and other progressives to form the Progressive Party, Johnson won the party's 1912 vice-presidential nomination. In one of the best third-party performances in U.S. history, the ticket finished second nationally in the popular and electoral votes.

Johnson was elected to the U.S. Senate in 1916, becoming a leader of the chamber's Progressive Republicans. He made his biggest mark in the Senate as an early voice for isolationism but voted for U.S. entry into World War I. He opposed U.S. participation in the League of Nations. He unsuccessfully sought the Republican presidential nomination in 1920 and 1924. Although he supported Democratic nominee Franklin D. Roosevelt in the 1932 presidential election and many of the New Deal programs, by November 1936 he had become hostile to Roosevelt, whom he viewed as a potential dictator. He remained in the Senate until his death in 1945.

== Early years ==
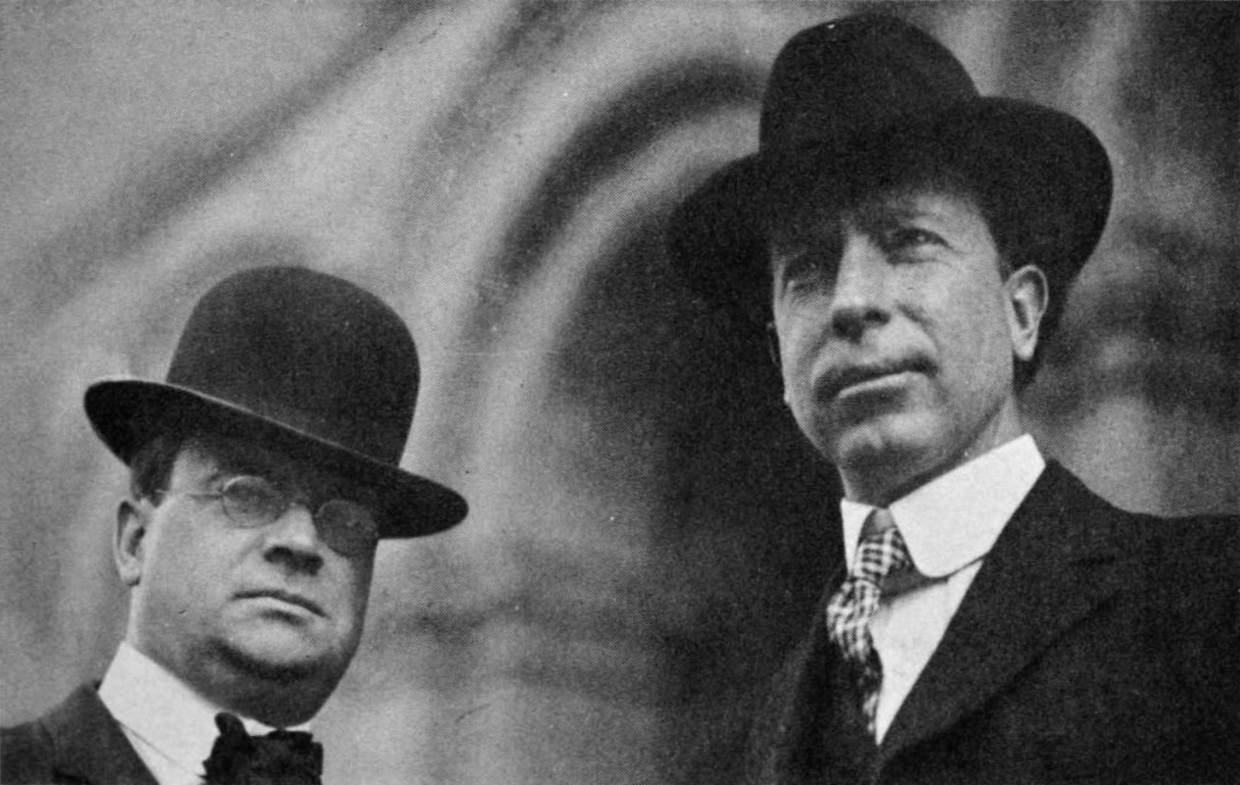
Johnson (left), specially retained by the State, and District Attorney William H. Langdon arrive for trial preliminaries on behalf of the prosecution, 1906

Hiram Johnson was born in Sacramento on September 2, 1866. His father, Grove Lawrence Johnson, was an attorney and Republican U.S. Representative and a member of the California State Legislature whose career was marred by accusations of election fraud and graft. His mother, Mabel Ann "Annie" Williamson De Montfredy, was a member of the Daughters of the American Revolution based on her descent from Pierre Van Cortlandt and Philip Van Cortlandt. Johnson had one brother and three sisters.

Johnson attended the public schools of Sacramento and was 16 when he graduated from Sacramento High School in 1882 as the class valedictorian. Too young to begin attending college, Johnson worked as a shorthand reporter and stenographer in his father's law office and attended Heald's Business College. He studied law at the University of California, Berkeley from 1884 to 1886, where he was a member of Chi Phi fraternity. After his admission to the bar in 1888, Johnson practiced in Sacramento with his brother Albert as the firm of Johnson & Johnson. When the State Bar of California was organized in 1927, William H. Waste, the Chief Justice of the California Supreme Court, was given license number one and Johnson received number two. Both his son, Hiram Jr. and grandson, Hiram III, were later members of the California State Bar.

In addition to practicing law, Johnson was active in politics as a Republican, including supporting his father's campaigns. In 1899, Johnson backed the mayoral campaign of George H. Clark. Clark won, and when he took office in 1900, he named Johnson as city attorney.

In 1902, Johnson moved to San Francisco, where he quickly developed a reputation as a fearless litigator, primarily as a criminal defense lawyer, while becoming active in reform politics. He attracted statewide attention in 1908 when he assisted District Attorney William H. Langdon and Assistant DA Francis J. Heney in the prosecution of Abe Ruef and Mayor Eugene Schmitz for graft. After Heney was shot in the courtroom during an attempted assassination, Johnson took the lead for the prosecution and won the case.

== Governor of California (1911–1917) ==
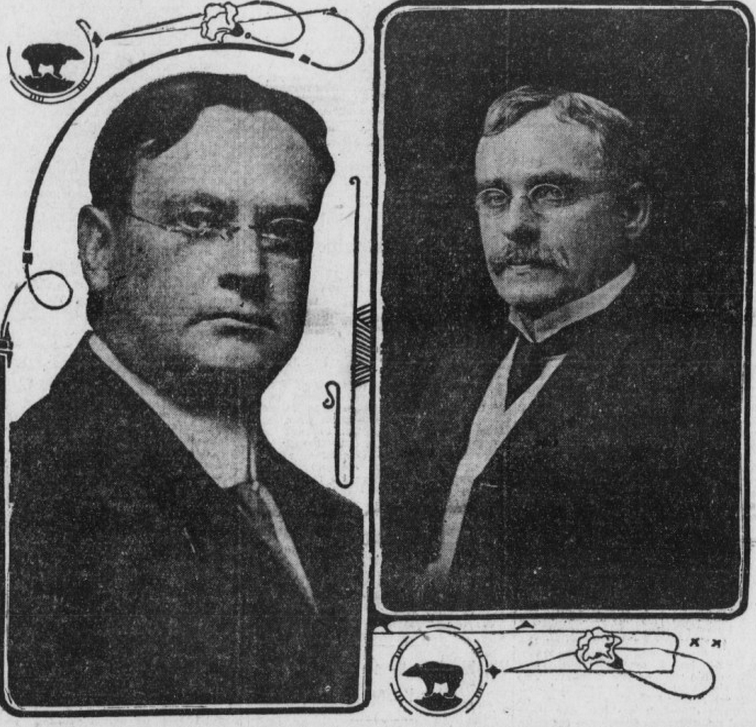
Johnson and newly elected Lieutenant Governor A. J. Wallace, right, in the Los Angeles Herald, November 9, 1910

In 1910, Johnson won the gubernatorial election as a member of the Lincoln–Roosevelt League, a Progressive Republican movement, running on a platform opposed to the Southern Pacific Railroad. During his campaign, he toured the state in an open automobile, covering thousands of miles and visiting small communities throughout California that were inaccessible by rail. Johnson helped establish rules that made voting and the political process easier, such as precedent to facilitate recalls. This measure was used to remove Governor Gray Davis from office in 2003 and to enable an unsuccessful effort to remove Governor Gavin Newsom in 2021.

Johnson takes the oath of office for his second term, January 5, 1915

In office, Johnson was a populist who promoted a number of democratic reforms, namely the election of U.S. senators by direct popular vote rather than the state legislature, which was later ratified nationwide by a constitutional amendment, cross-filing, initiative, referendum, and recall elections. Johnson's reforms gave California a degree of direct democracy unmatched by any other U.S. state at the time. When he took office, amid rampant corruption, the Southern Pacific Railroad held so much power it was known as the fourth branch of government. "While I do not by any means believe the initiative, the referendum and the recall are the panacea for all our political ills," Johnson extolled in his 1911 inaugural address, "they do give to the electorate the power of action when desired, and they do place in the hands of the people the means by which they may protect themselves."

Johnson was also instrumental in reining in the power of the Southern Pacific Railroad through the establishment of a state railroad commission. On taking office, Johnson paroled Chris Evans, convicted as the Southern Pacific train bandit, but required that he leave California.

Johnson signed the California Alien Land Law of 1913 into law. The law, motivated by anti-Japanese animus, prevented Asian immigrants from owning land in the state; they were already racially excluded from naturalized citizenship. Johnson was initially quiet on the proposed legislation, but supported it and signed it into law to bolster his presidential ambitions. With the Woodrow Wilson's victory in the 1912 presidential election, it was in Johnson's interest to stand up to the new Democratic administration, which opposed the Alien Land Law, and build a base of public support in California for the 1916 presidential election.

=== 1912 vice presidential campaign ===
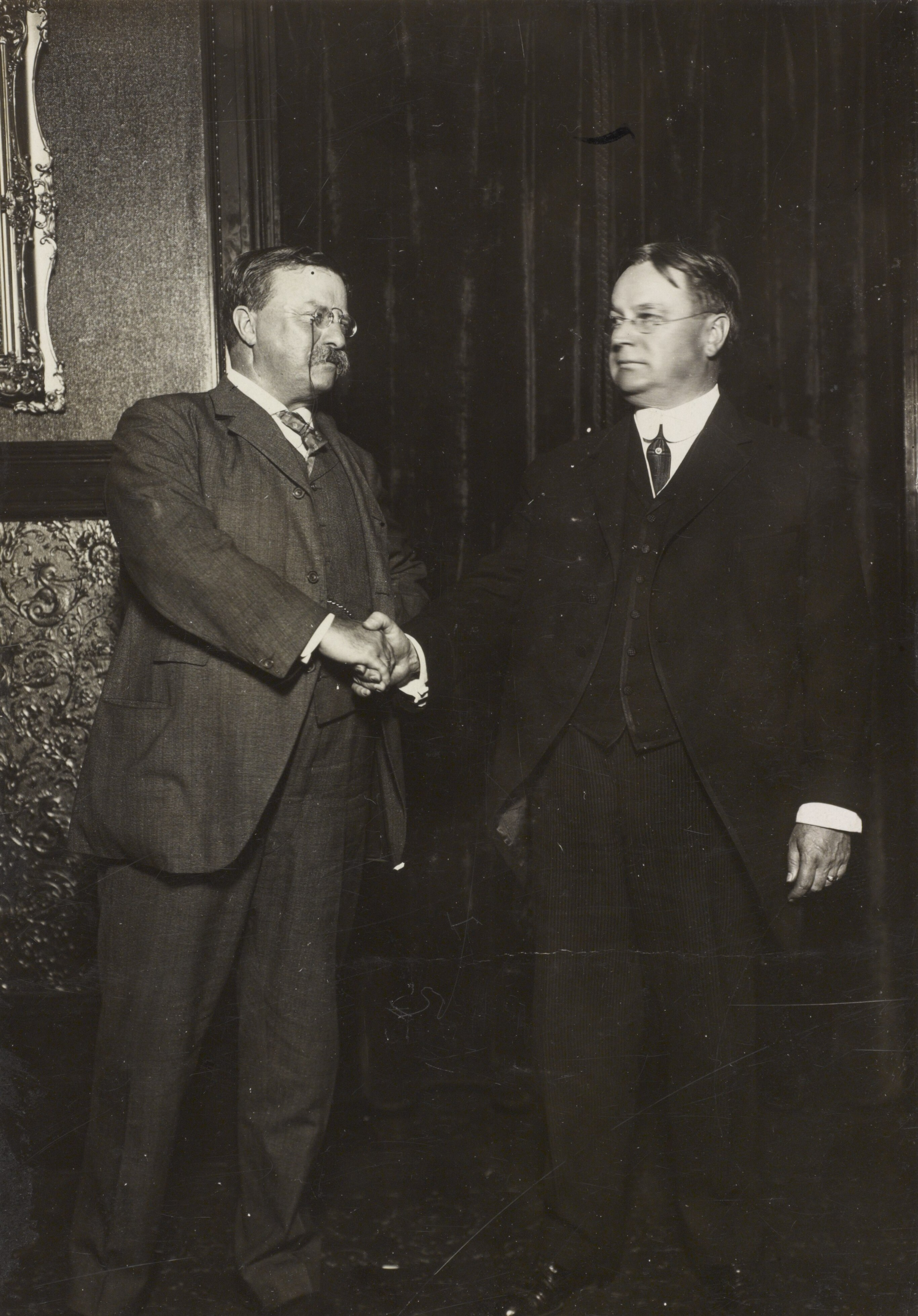
Theodore Roosevelt and Johnson shake hands after their nominations as president and vice president, respectively.

In 1912, Johnson was a founder of the national Progressive Party and ran as the party's vice presidential candidate, sharing a ticket with former President Theodore Roosevelt. Roosevelt and Johnson narrowly carried California, but finished second nationally behind the Democratic ticket of Woodrow Wilson and Thomas R. Marshall. Their second-place finish, ahead of incumbent Republican President William Howard Taft, remains among the strongest for any minor party in American history.

Johnson was re-elected governor of California in 1914 as the Progressive Party candidate, gaining nearly twice the votes of his Republican opponent John D. Fredericks. In 1917, as one of his final acts as governor before ascending to the U.S. Senate, Johnson signed Senate Constitutional Amendment 26, providing health insurance for all in the Golden State. Then it was put on the ballot for ratification. A coalition of insurance companies took out an ad in The Chronicle, warning it "would spell social ruin to the United States." Every voter in the state, as recounted in a recent issue of the New Yorker, "received in the mail a pamphlet with a picture of the Kaiser and the words 'Born in Germany. Do you want it in California?'" The ballot measure failed, 27%–73%.

== U.S. Senator (1917–1945) ==
In 1916, Johnson ran successfully for the U.S. Senate, defeating conservative Democrat George S. Patton Sr. and took office on March 16, 1917. Johnson was elected as a staunch opponent of American entry into World War I, but voted in favor of war after his election. He later voted against the League of Nations. He allegedly said, "The first casualty when war comes is truth." However, this quote may be apocryphal.

During his Senate career, Johnson served as chairman of the Committees on Cuban Relations (66th Congress), Patents (67th Congress), Immigration (68th through 71st Congresses), Territories and Insular Possessions (68th Congress), and Commerce (71st and 72nd Congresses).

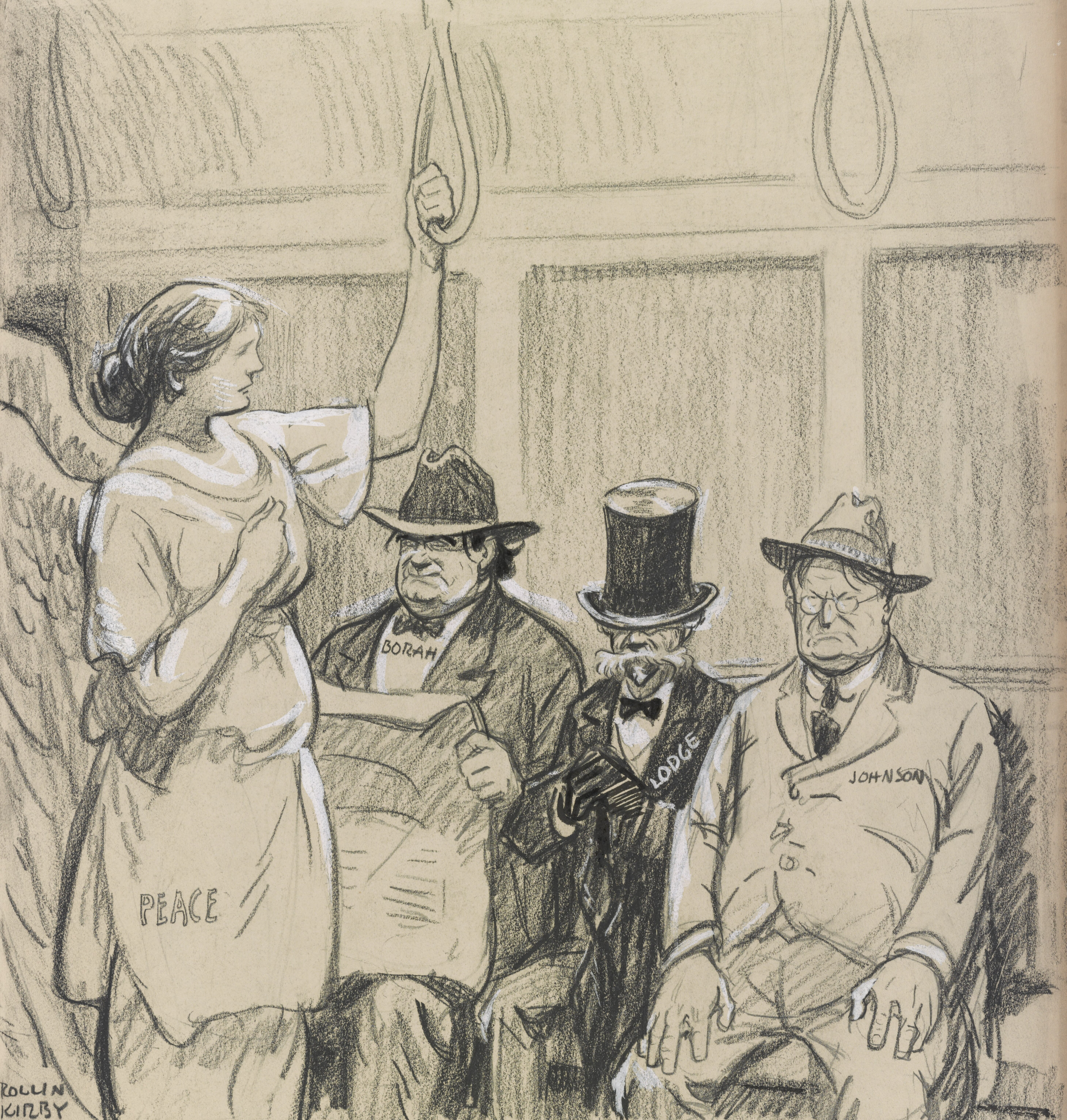
"Refusing to give the lady a seat"
Cartoon by Rollin Kirby mocking senators Borah, Lodge, and Johnson for their opposition to the Treaty of Versailles c. 1919–1920

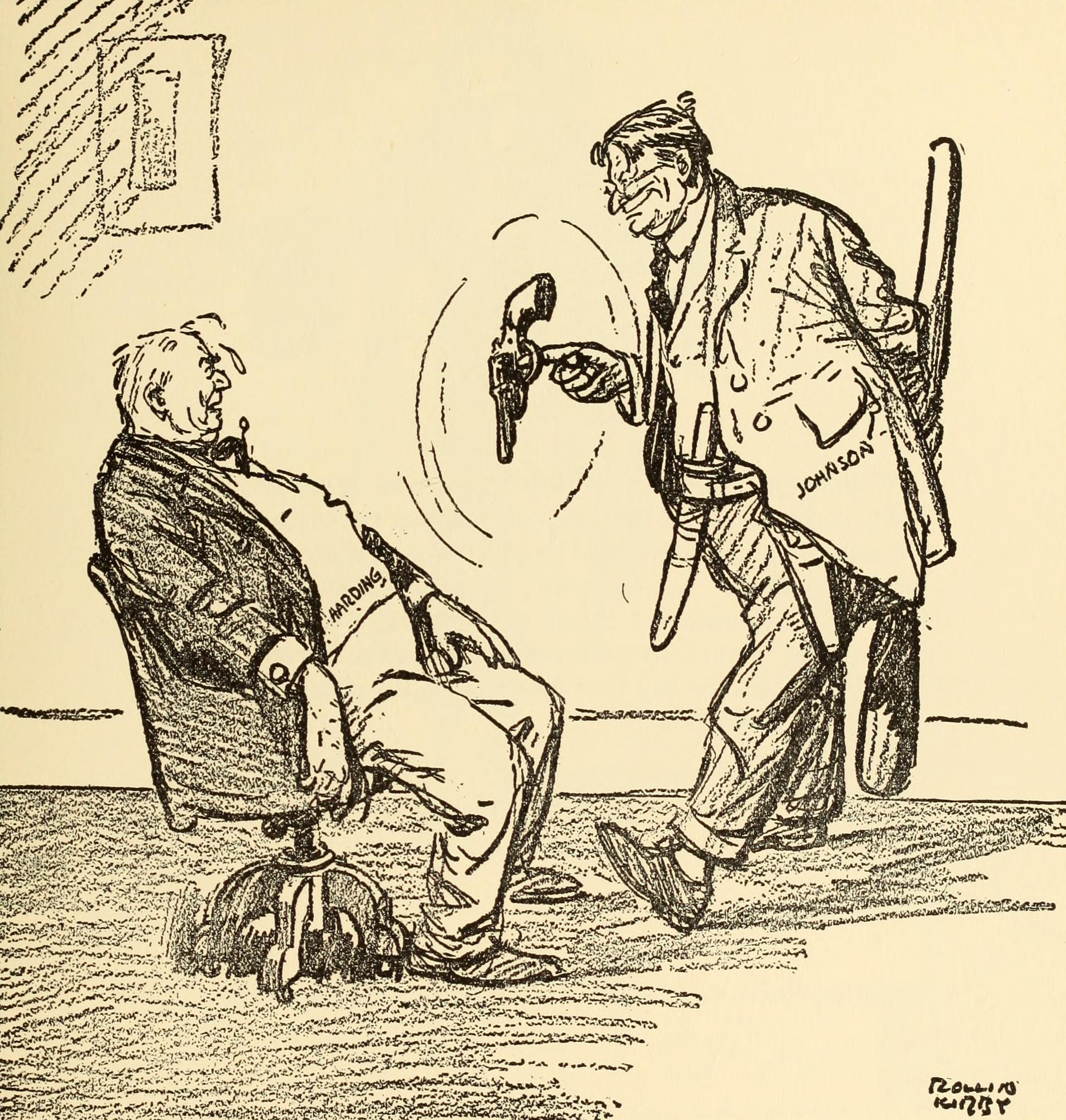
"'Gainst the League, Aint' You, Warren?"
Another cartoon by Kirby depicting Johnson coercing presidential candidate Warren G. Harding into opposing the League of Nations, (Note: Harding already opposed the League.) July 26, 1920

In 1916, Representative John I. Nolan introduced H.R. 7625, which would have established a $3 per day minimum wage for federal employees. It was endorsed by the AFL and the National Federation of Federal Employees, but the bill's opponents in the House kept it from coming to a vote. In 1918, Senator Johnson co-sponsored the legislation, and it became known as the Johnson-Nolan Minimum Wage Bill. It passed the House that September, but was stalled in the Senate Committee on Education and Labor. It was reintroduced two years later and passed in both the House and Senate, but when it went to conference it was filibustered by Southern Democrats who opposed it because it would have paid African American employees the same as white employees.

In the Senate, Johnson helped push through the Immigration Act of 1924, having worked with Valentine S. McClatchy and other anti-Japanese lobbyists to prohibit Japanese and other East Asian immigrants from entering the United States.

In the early 1920s, the motion picture industry sought to establish a self-regulatory process to fend off official censorship. Senator Johnson was among three candidates identified to head a new group, alongside Herbert Hoover and Will H. Hays. Hays, who had managed President Harding's 1920 campaign, was ultimately named to head the new Motion Picture Producers and Distributors of America in early 1922.

As Senator, Johnson proved extremely popular. In 1934, he was re-elected with 94.5 percent of the popular vote; he was nominated by both the Republican and Democratic parties and his only opponent was Socialist George Ross Kirkpatrick.

Johnson was a member of the Senate Foreign Relations Committee continuously for 25 years, from the 66th Congress (1919–21) through the 78th Congress (1943–44) and one of its longest-serving members. In 1943, a confidential analysis of the Senate Foreign Relations Committee, made by British scholar Isaiah Berlin for his Foreign Office, stated that Johnson:

is the Isolationists' elder statesman and the only surviving member of the [William E.] Borah–[Henry Cabot] Lodge–Johnson combination which led the fight against the League in 1919 and 1920. He is an implacable and uncompromising Isolationist with immense prestige in California, of which he has twice been Governor. His election to the Senate has not been opposed for many years by either party. He is acutely Pacific-conscious and is a champion of a more adequate defence of the West Coast. He is a member of the Farm Bloc and is au fond, against foreign affairs as such; his view of Europe as a sink of iniquity has not changed in any particular since 1912, when he founded a short-lived progressive party. His prestige in Congress is still great and his parliamentary skill should not be underestimated.

In 1945, Johnson was absent when the vote took place for ratification of the United Nations Charter, but made it known that he would have voted against this outcome. Senators Henrik Shipstead and William Langer were the only ones to cast votes opposing ratification.

=== Presidential politics ===
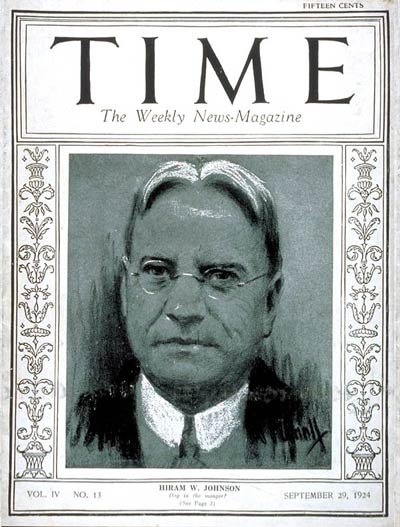
Time cover, September 29, 1924

Following Theodore Roosevelt's death in January 1919, Johnson was the most prominent leader in the surviving progressive movement; the Progressive Party of 1912 was dead. In 1920, he ran for the Republican nomination for president but was defeated by conservative Senator Warren Harding. Johnson did not get the support of Roosevelt's family, who instead supported Roosevelt's long-time friend Leonard Wood. At the convention, Johnson was asked to serve as Harding's running mate but he declined. Johnson sought the 1924 Republican nomination against President Calvin Coolidge; his campaign was derailed after he lost the California primary. Johnson declined to challenge Herbert Hoover for the 1928 presidential nomination, instead choosing to seek re-election to the Senate.

In the 1932 United States presidential election, Johnson broke with President Hoover. He was one of the most prominent Republicans to support Democrat Franklin D. Roosevelt. During Roosevelt's first term, Johnson supported the president's New Deal economic recovery package and frequently "crossed the floor" to aid the Democrats. By late 1936, he was convinced that Roosevelt was a dangerous would-be dictator. Although in poor health, Johnson attacked Roosevelt and the New Deal following the Judicial Procedures Reform Bill of 1937, the president's "Court Packing Bill" attempt.

== Personal life ==
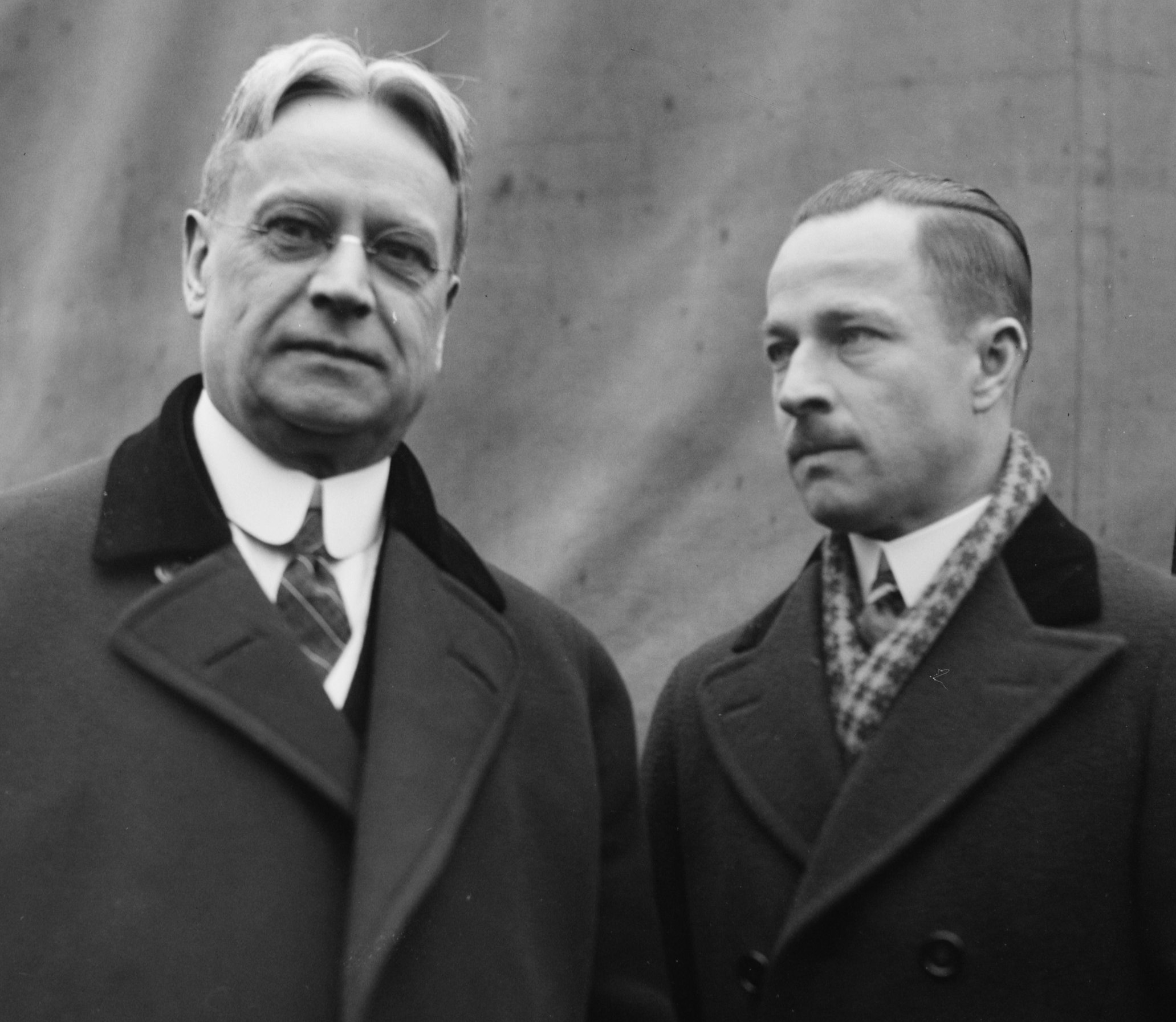
Johnson (left) with his oldest son, Hiram Jr. c. 1920–1925

In January 1886, Johnson married Minne L. McNeal (1869–1947). The couple had two sons: Hiram W. "Jack" Johnson Jr. (1886–1959), and Archibald "Archie" McNeal Johnson (1890–1933). Both sons practiced law in California and served in the army. Hiram Jr. was a veteran of World War I, and attained the rank of lieutenant colonel in the Army Air Corps while stationed at Fort Mason in San Francisco during World War II. Archie Johnson was a major of field artillery corps and was wounded in action during the First World War.

== Death ==
Having served in the Senate for almost thirty years, Johnson died of a cerebral thrombosis at the Naval Hospital in Bethesda, Maryland, on August 5, 1945, the day before the U.S.-conducted atomic bombing of Hiroshima. He had been in failing health for several months. He was interred in a mausoleum at Cypress Lawn Memorial Park in Colma, California and his remains are interred with those of his wife, Minne, and two sons.

== Legacy ==
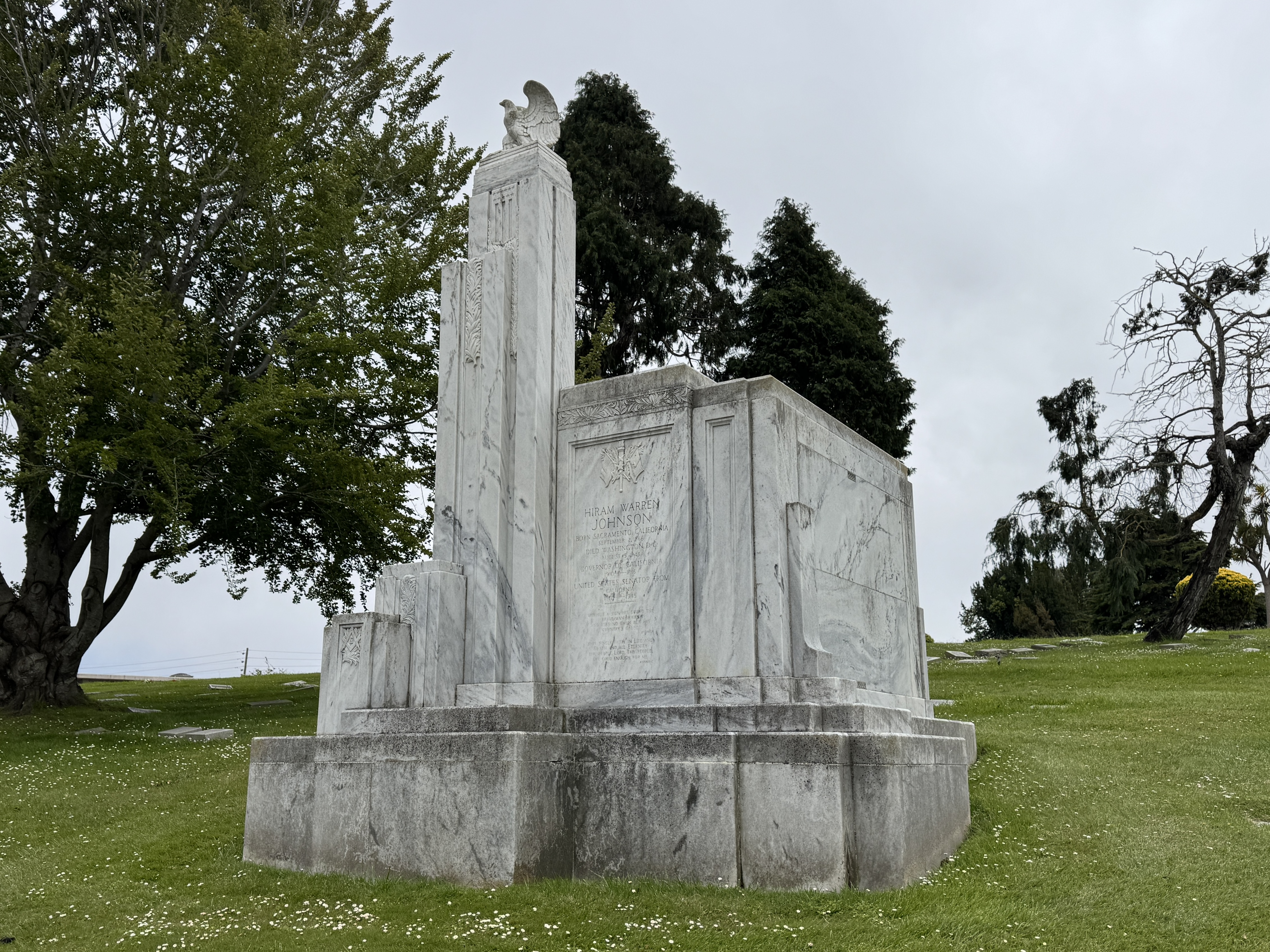
Hiram Johnson's mausoleum at Cypress Lawn Memorial Park in Colma, California.

During his first term gubernatorial inaugural address on January 3, 1911, Johnson declared that his first duty was "to eliminate every private interest from the government and to make the public service of the State responsive solely to the people." Committed to "arm the people to protect themselves" against such abuses, Johnson proposed amending the state Constitution with "the initiative, the referendum and the recall." All three of these progressive reforms were enacted during his governorship, forever guaranteeing Johnson's stature as the preeminent progressive reformer of California politics. His contribution as the driving force behind the direct democratic process for removal of elected officials was revisited in the media and by the general public during the successful 2003 California recall election of Democratic governor Gray Davis. Republican Arnold Schwarzenegger, the eventual winner, referred to Johnson's progressive legacy in his campaign speeches. Johnson's stature in fostering the California recall and ballot initiative direct democratic processes again surfaced in the media during the unsuccessful 2021 California recall election of Democratic governor Gavin Newsom.

On August 25, 2009, Governor Schwarzenegger and his wife, Maria Shriver, announced that Johnson would be one of 13 inducted into the California Hall of Fame that year.

Johnson held the record as California's longest-serving United States Senator for over 75 years, until it was broken by Democrat Dianne Feinstein on March 28, 2021. He remains the longest-serving Republican senator and the longest-serving male senator from California.

The Hiram Johnson papers, consisting primarily of hundreds of letters that Johnson wrote to his two sons over the course of decades, and that his son, Hiram Jr. donated in 1955, reside at the Bancroft Library at the University of California, Berkeley.

Hiram Johnson High School in Sacramento, California is named in his honor.

== See also ==
- List of members of the United States Congress who died in office (1900–1949)

== Notes ==
Party political offices
Preceded by James Gillett	Republican nominee for Governor of California; 1910	Succeeded by John D. Fredericks
First	Progressive nominee for Vice President of the United States; 1912	Party dissolved
First	Progressive nominee for Governor of California; 1914	Party dissolved
First	Republican nominee for U.S. Senator from California (Class 1); 1916, 1922, 1928, 1934, 1940	Succeeded by William Knowland
Preceded by Minor Moore	Democratic nominee for U.S. Senator from California (Class 1); Endorsed; 1934, 1940	Succeeded by Will Rogers
Political offices
Preceded by James Gillett	Governor of California; 1911–1917	Succeeded by William Stephens
U.S. Senate
Preceded by John D. Works	U.S. Senator (Class 1) from California; 1917–1945; Served alongside: James D. Phelan, Samuel M. Shortridge, William Gibbs McAdoo, Thomas M. Storke, Sheridan Downey	Succeeded by William Knowland
Preceded by Oscar Underwood	Chair of the Senate Cuban Relations Committee; 1919–1921	Position abolished
Preceded by George W. Norris	Chair of the Senate Patents Committee; 1921–1923	Succeeded by Richard P. Ernst
Preceded by Wesley L. Jones	Chair of the Senate Commerce Committee; 1930–1933	Succeeded by Hubert D. Stephens
Awards and achievements
Preceded by Leo Baekeland	Cover of Time; September 29, 1924	Succeeded by William Allen White
