= Walter Thomas Mills =

New Zealand politician

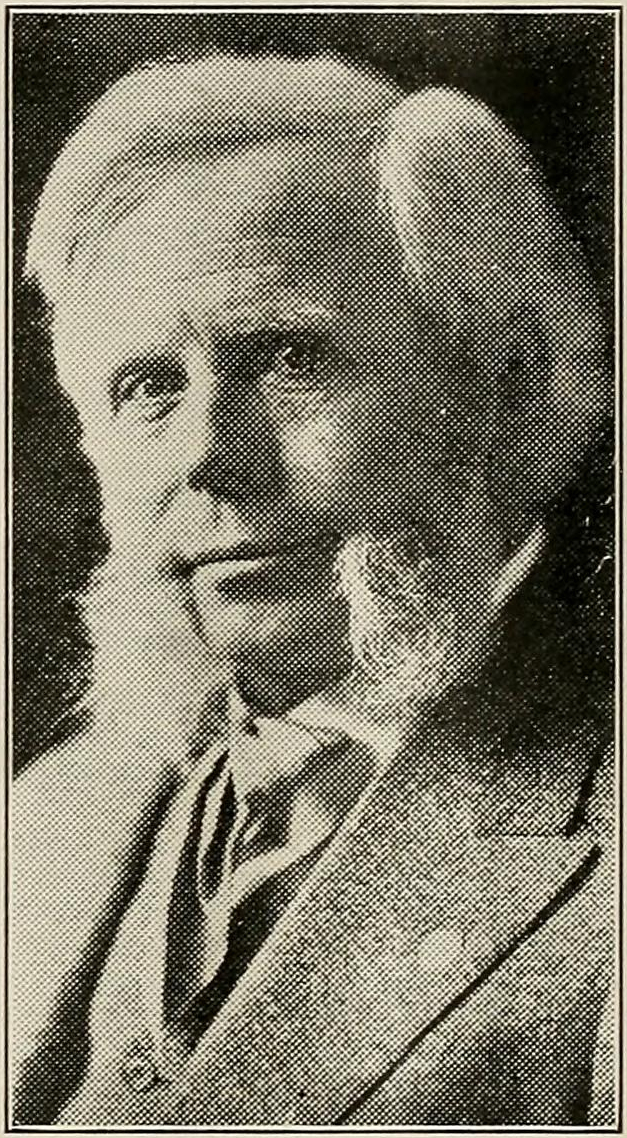
- Mills c. 1917
- Born: May 11, 1856; Duane, New York, U.S.
- Died: May 7, 1942 (aged 85); Los Angeles, California, U.S.
- Education: Oberlin College; College of Wooster
- Political party: Socialist
- Other political affiliations: United Labour (1912–1914); Social Democratic (1913–1914); Nonpartisan League (after 1922)

Walter Thomas Mills (May 11, 1856 – May 7, 1942) was an American socialist activist, educator, lecturer, writer, and newspaper publisher. He is best remembered for the role he played in the Socialist Party of America during the first decade of the 20th Century as one of the leaders of the organization's moderate wing. He also was a key actor in the labor movement of New Zealand as a founder of the United Labour Party in 1912. He returned to the United States in 1914 with the advent of World War I and worked unsuccessfully to keep the country out of the bloody European conflict, eventually leaving the socialist movement in the 1920s.

== Biography ==
=== Early years ===
Walter Thomas Mills — he was known by his contemporaries by his full name — was born May 11, 1856, in Duane, New York, the son of a Quaker farmer, Charles Mills, and his wife, Mahetabel Ladd Mills. The family moved to Iowa when Walter was a boy and he worked at a variety of jobs in his youth to save up enough money to put himself through college.

Mills was a graduate of Oberlin College, a liberal arts school in Oberlin, Ohio, where he earned his bachelor's degree. He went on to earn a master's degree from the College of Wooster in Wooster, Ohio, in 1898.

After finishing his education, Mills became active in the cause of alcoholic prohibition, a cause which forced him to think about social issues in a large context. As a result of reading and introspection about such matters, Mills turned his attention to socialism in the 1880s. Together with the Rev. A.J. Jutkins in 1886 Mills launched a Chicago magazine called The Statesman: A Monthly Magazine Devoted to the Problems of Practical Politics, Co-Operative Industry, and Self-Help. His first book, The Science of Politics, was published by Funk and Wagnalls one year later.

Driven by his beliefs to public speaking on political themes, Mills soon developed oratorical expertise which was acknowledged by political friends and enemies alike. This reputation as a vigorous platform speaker, combined with Mills' shortness of stature — he stood just 4 feet and 6 inches (1.37 meters) tall — lead some detractors to mockingly refer to Mills as "The Little Giant," a twisted reference to Abraham Lincoln's 1860 Presidential debate opponent Stephen A. Douglas.

=== Political career ===
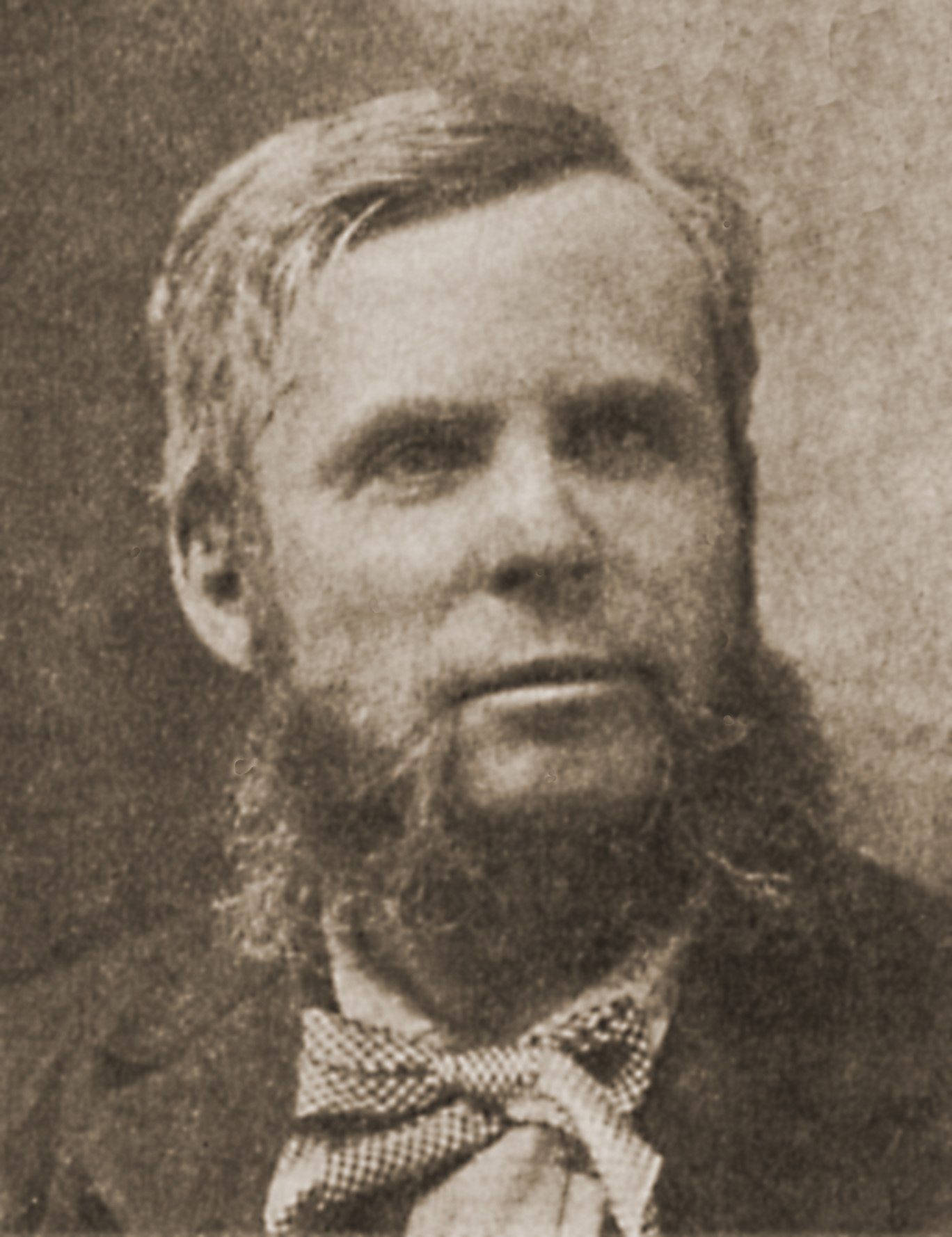
Walter Thomas Mills was a superb orator and an inveterate factional pugilist who played a large role in the socialist movements of the United States and New Zealand.

Mills was initially involved in a series of socialist-themed educational and living schemes of dubious soundness. He organized a so-called People's University in Berrien Springs, Michigan, in the first years of the 20th century, soliciting funds and then exiting the project immediately before its collapse. He repeated this basic plan in Kansas City, Missouri, renting a cavernous building on adjacent to the city's stockyards, furnishing it at great expense, soliciting annual subscriptions to a publication called The Socialist Teacher, and then quitting the project after just three months.

Mills was similarly involved in colony schemes in Michigan, Kansas City, and Colorado, all of which drew cash infusions from outside investors before failing in short order.

Regardless of whether his series of economic catastrophes was by design or bad luck, the skilled orator Mills was anxiously sought as a public speaker on socialist themes throughout the country, usually under the auspices of states controlled by electorally oriented "constructive socialists." Mills' predilection for appearing on the scene of factional wars and forcefully advocating the moderate line has led him to be characterized by one historian of the period as an oratorial gun for hire consciously employed by moderate factionalists in various states to rally the troops.

In the summer of 1903, moderate socialists won majority control of Central Branch of Local Seattle of the Socialist Party — the largest of seven branches in the city — and brought Mills to Seattle on behalf of the local. Mills was anathema to radical newspaper publisher Hermon F. Titus, the head of the powerful left wing faction in the Socialist Party of Washington, who saw Mills as a living embodiment of middle class reformism.

After hearing Mills' presentation, a committee of the Local Seattle, Central Branch, headed by William McDevitt, drafted a resolution endorsing Mills as "an uncompromising, class-conscious, and revolutionary Socialist" and upbraiding Hermon Titus's newspaper for participating in a "plan to silence Mills by driving him off the Socialist lecture platform, and by blacklisting him in the eyes of the Socialist Party."

This proved to be a red flag to the Reds. Titus railed against "the Mills men" using "packed" meetings to gain control of the Central Branch and the Seattle City Central Committee in the absence of other delegates. "They will stop at nothing in the way of injustice," Titus indignantly proclaimed. Washington state remained bitterly divided along factional lines for the rest of the decade.

==== The Mills Affair of 1907 ====
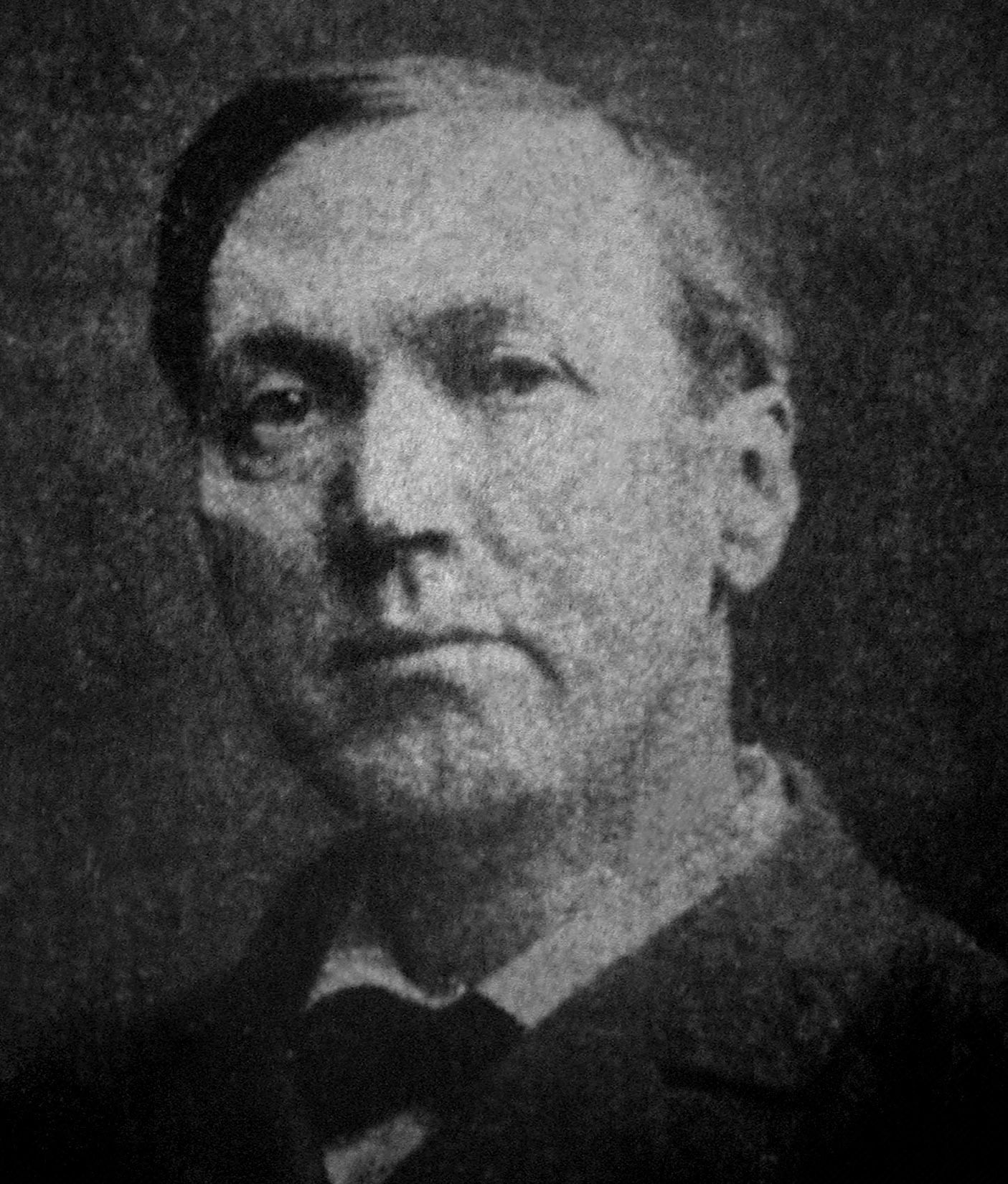
Left wing Seattle newspaper publisher Hermon F. Titus was the nemesis of Walter Thomas Mills during his years in that city.

The arrival of Walter Thomas Mills as a Seattle resident in 1906 energized the embattled moderate faction, which had in the previous year managed to deprive the revolutionary socialists of their center of power, the Pike Street Branch of Local Seattle, through a reorganization orchestrated by the Seattle City Central Committee only to see lose Local Seattle lose its charter and be reorganized by the left wing-dominated State Executive Committee. Mills persuaded the Seattle moderates who had been cast aside by the Socialist Party of Washington and who had organized themselves as the "Propaganda Club of Seattle" to rejoin the Socialist Party, with a view to winning control.

Throughout early 1907 Mills conducted Sunday afternoon meetings independent or the regularly scheduled Sunday afternoon propaganda meetings of Local Seattle, using these gatherings as a means of making contact with Socialists discontented with the left wing state organization and leadership of the reorganized Local Seattle. By the first of June, Mills' Sunday meetings — scheduled in direct conflict with the regular Sunday propaganda meetings of the left wing-dominated officialdom, had resulted in "steadily diminished" crowds being drawn by the left and a great expansion of the size and confidence of the moderate faction. "This is a great setback from the time when the revolutionary element had absolute control in the party some four or five months ago," left wing adherent Harry Ault declared.

The situation was complex, however. In March 1907, Mills had been charged by the British Columbia Dominion Executive Committee of the Socialist Party of Canada with having advocated "compromise and fusion" in a speech delivered in Victoria on December 28, 1906, in which Mills urged support of the Canadian Labor Party. Having gotten wind of Mills' fusionist heresy, left wing Washington State Committee member Alfred Wagenknecht wrote to the BC Dominion Executive Committee on February 20, 1907, soliciting a complaint against Mills. The Dominion Executive Committee complied on March 6 with a letter to the Washington State Executive Committee, which lead to charges being preferred against Mills. Both sides began to organize frantically for the May Washington State Convention, which was seen as the means by which the dilemma could be overcome by Mills forces — a majority at the convention for the moderates would mean a new State Committee and an end to pressure.

Mills was brought to trial before the Local Seattle on Sunday, April 28, 1907, at 10 am on the Victoria speech. Before the largest mass meeting of Local Seattle in the organization's history, charges were read by J.G. Morgan, Secretary of the Socialist Party of Canada. Mill pleaded "not guilty" and the point was reached where Morgan was to make his opening statement and to introduce his evidence. Suddenly, Mills was given the floor and he made a motion of adjournment, which was quickly seconded and carried amid the whooping and shouting of his supporters.

Despite being outnumbered in the city of Seattle and unable to discipline Mills through Local Seattle, the left wing still held the reins of the State Committee, which continued to mull over the situation into June. At its June 10, 1907, meeting, the State Executive Committee (formerly the Local Quorum) discussed the situation at length and telegraphed a forthcoming action to the membership in a tersely worded report by State Secretary Richard Krueger that he had been instructed "to communicate with all the state committeemen and inform said committeemen of all the facts" regarding the failure of Local Seattle to "deal in a constitutional manner with the charges against Walter Thomas Mills."

On June 23, 1907, the State Executive Committee tabulated a poll of the members of the State Committee and instructed the State Secretary to prepare evidence in proper documentary form and to notify Local Seattle to do likewise, with the deadline for submission of its defense given of 30 minutes before the start of the next scheduled meeting of the SEC. Evidence from both sides was heard at the July 7, 1907, meeting of the SEC, and the evidence sent out to the members of the left wing-dominated State Committee for decision. The results were announced on Sunday, July 21, 1907 — a unanimous vote to revoke the charter of Local Seattle for its failure to take action against Walter Thomas Mills. Hermon Titus's right-hand man at the Seattle Socialist, Harry Ault, claimed to speak for "a large number of members of Local Seattle, perhaps even a majority" when he declared:

"These comrades are disgusted with the rule or ruin policy of the opportunists, who, though they have been defeated in every state convention and in every referendum in which they have crossed swords with the revolutionists, persist in creating strife and dissension in the party in this state.

"The importation of Walter Thomas Mills is merely the culminating act of a band of desperate filibusterers, who, having been foiled in their attempts to control the party, resort to this means to disrupt it and organize it anew upon their plan."

Mills-dominated Local Seattle was once again cast adrift by the Socialist Party of Washington, a deep split which deprived the SPW of its largest Local and virtually insured that the matter would be appealed to the national level at the party's forthcoming convention of 1908.

=== Years abroad ===
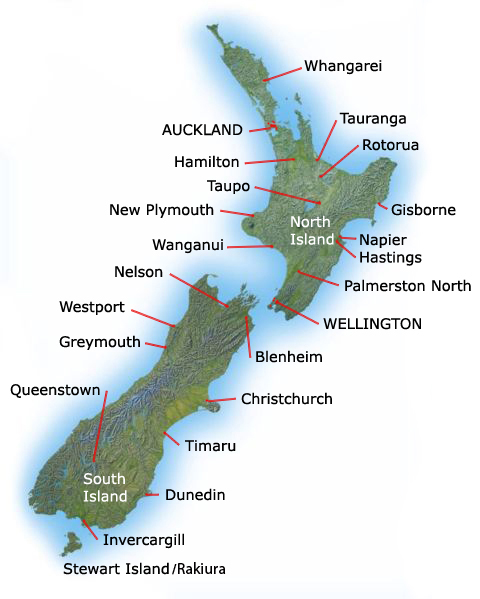
From 1911 to 1914 Mills traveled thousands of miles around New Zealand organizing a political wing of the labor movement there.

In 1910 Mills left the United States to conduct what he called a "World-Round Lecture Tour," heading first for England. Mills chronicled his thoughts and adventures in a regular column in the pages of Victor L. Berger's Milwaukee weekly, the Social-Democratic Herald. The first of these letters from the road appeared in the October 22, 1910, edition of the Herald.

In 1911, Mills was invited by the Trades and Labour Councils of New Zealand to tour the country, speaking on the cause of labor unity. Similar in climate to the Pacific Northwest from whence he most recently hailed, Mills was quickly engrossed with the mission of uniting the deeply divided labor and left wing political movements of New Zealand and he wound up putting down roots.

Mills was criticized by radical trade unionists such as Pat Hickey, Paddy Webb and Bob Semple for his emphasis on organizing the staid middle class. During the 1911 election campaign Mills faced Scott Bennett in a series of highly publicized debates which emphasized the ideological issues which split the New Zealand labor movement.

Mills was instrumental in the founding of the United Labour Party of New Zealand (ULP) on Easter Sunday 1912. The existence of this new moderate organization sharpened the heated conflict even further, with the bitterness in Auckland even periodically erupting into fist fights. Mills travelled thousands of miles on his organizing mission, speaking to public meetings across both islands of the country.

While many unions refused to affiliate with the ULP, Mills still played a large role at a 1913 conference to mobilize the New Zealand labor movement against the government of William Massey. Mills managed to convince the various factions at the conference to merge into two new organizations vaguely following American institutions: the United Federation of Labour and the Social Democratic Party. Many of Mills' old enemies joined him in repudiating an exclusive reliance on industrial militancy in favor of parallel political action.

Mills left the country with his wife as suddenly as he arrived in 1914, returning to the United States.

=== Later years ===
Cover of the 1915 pamphlet War, published by the Socialist Party and including Mills' essay "Make an End of War."

Upon returning to America in 1914, Mills once again became involved in the activities of the Socialist Party of America. Despite his renown as one of the most moderate voices in the Socialist Party, Mills was a devoted anti-militarist, perhaps owing to his Quaker background. Mills authored a pamphlet against the European war published by the SPA and spoke out publicly on anti-war themes.

Later in the 1910s, Mills was attracted to the newly formed Non-Partisan League (NPL), a cooperatively-oriented radical rural organization founded by former Socialist Arthur C. Townley and particularly strong in the Upper Midwestern states of North Dakota and Minnesota. Mills turned his attention away from the Socialist Party and became fully engaged in the activities of the NPL, having completely left the Socialist Party prior to 1922.

=== Death and legacy ===
Walter Thomas Mills died May 7, 1942, in Los Angeles, California.

== Works ==
- The Science of Politics. New York: Funk and Wagnalls, 1887.
- The Product-Sharing Village. Chicago : Civic Letters, 1894.
- How Gouge Went to Heaven. Civic Letters vol. 1, no. 4. Oak Park, IL: Civic Letters, 1894.
- Tariff: Legislation or Arbitration? Chicago: Thorne, n.d. [1890s].
- Is Socialism Anti-Christian in its Tendency? Debate between Mr. W.F. Phillips, Newport, Affirmative, and Professor W.T. Mills, Milwaukee, USA, Negative, at the Workmen's Hall, Nantymoel... Aberdare, Wales: South Wales Divisional Council of the Independent Labour Party, n.d. [1890s].
- Evolutionary Politics: Addresses and Essays. Chicago: Charles H. Kerr & Co., 1898.
- How to Work for Socialism. Chicago: Charles H. Kerr & Co., 1900.
- What is Socialism? An Address Delivered at the State Convention of the Socialist Party at Sedalia, Mo., October 19th, 1901. Girard, KS: J.A. Wayland, 1901.
- The Struggle for Existence. Chicago: International School of Social Economy, 1904.
- How a Socialist Sees Things. Chicago: International School of Social Economy, 1906.
- What Is Socialism?: A Lecture. Spokane, WA: Workers Publishing Co, n.d. [c. 1911]. —Illustrated 2nd Edition of 1901 Sedalia, Missouri speech.
- Alcoholic Degeneracy: A Compelling Lecture. Invercargill, NZ: Southland Times, 1911.
- Proposals for Securing the Industrial and Political Union of All the Labour Organisations of New Zealand: Ready for Action! Are You Ready to Act? Auckland, NZ: New Zealand Worker, 1911.
- Unity Campaign, a Movement for the Industrial and Political Union of All Labour Organisations: Here are the Proposals: Solidarity, Strength, Progress. Auckland, NZ: New Zealand Worker, 1911.
- Why a Labour Party in New Zealand? Lower Hutt : Hutt and Petone Chronicle, 1912.
- The Unity Conference: Easter week, Auckland, March 17, 1912. Auckland, NZ: Voice, 1912.
- The United Labour Party: Its Constitution and Platform. Wellington, NZ: United Labor Party, 1912.
- Land Monopoly and How to End It. Wellington, NZ: United Labor Party, 1912.
- Amended Report of the Unity Scheme: Debate between H. Scott Bennett and Walter Thomas Mills which took place at Auckland on December 8th, 1911: Subject:— "Do the unity proposals embody all the necessary features for sound industrial and political organization of the working class of New Zealand?" Wellington: The Maoriland Workers, 1912.
- Political Parties and Poverty. Glasgow : Reformer's Bookstall, n.d. [1910s].
- "Cooperation and the Labor Movement," The Western Comrade, vol. 2, no. 5 (Sept. 1914), pp. 14–15.
- War. Mills essay "Make an End to War" along with "Big Business and War" by Charles Edward Russell. Chicago: Socialist Party, 1915.
- Democracy or Despotism. Berkeley, CA: International School of Social Economy, 1916.
- The Articles of Association of the National Nonpartisan League: Together with a Discussion of the Democracy of the League's Purposes, the Democracy of its Form of Organization, the Democracy of the Measures Supported by the League, and the Ending of the Autocratic Monopolies and the Triumph of Democracy. St. Paul, MN: National Nonpartisan League, n.d. [c. 1918]
- Your Choice: Government by Plunderers or Producers. Fargo, ND: North Dakota Nonpartisan League, n.d. [c. 1920].
- The Voice of the Sea. Santa Ana, CA: Standard Print. Co., 1933.
