= Susan Thornton Glassell =

American socialite

- Born: March 2, 1835; Orange County, Virginia
- Died: November 16, 1883 (aged 48)
- Spouses: George S. Patton, Sr; George Hugh Smith
- Children: George S. Patton

Susan Thornton Glassell (March 2, 1835 – November 16, 1883) was the wife of Col. George Patton and later of Col. George H. Smith, the sister of Andrew Glassell and the paternal grandmother of Gen. George S. Patton.

== Early life ==
Susan Thornton Glassell was born in Orange County, Virginia, the daughter of Andrew Glassell (1793–1873) and Susan Thompson Thornton (1804–1836). In 1834 her family moved to Greensboro, Alabama, where her father engaged in cotton planting.

== Virginia ==
In 1855, she married George Smith Patton (1833–1864), who became a colonel in the 22nd Virginia Infantry of the Confederate Army in Richmond, Va. They had five children. George S. Patton died at the 3rd Battle of Winchester in the Civil War.

== Los Angeles ==
Left a widow, Susan left Virginia to live with her brother Andrew Glassell, a prominent lawyer in Los Angeles. Susan Glassell opened a school to support her family. Her son George S. Patton II (1856–1927) became a prominent lawyer and married into the wealthy family of Benjamin Davis Wilson (see also George S. Patton, Jr.). Her daughter Eleanor Thornton Patton (1857–1937) married Los Angeles lawyer Thomas Bruen Brown in 1879.

In 1870, Susan married Colonel George H. Smith. He was a first cousin of her first husband, and a lawyer, practicing in partnership with her brother Andrew Glassell under the firm name of Glassell, Chapman & Smith.

Two children were born of this marriage, Anne Ophelia Smith (1870–1951) and Ettinge Hugh Smith (1876–1887). Anne Ophelia Smith married Hancock Banning (1865–1925) son of Phineas Banning in 1890. Anne Banning established the National Assistance League in 1936.

Susan Glassell Smith is interred at Inglewood Park Cemetery in Los Angeles.
