= Andrew Glassell =

American lawyer

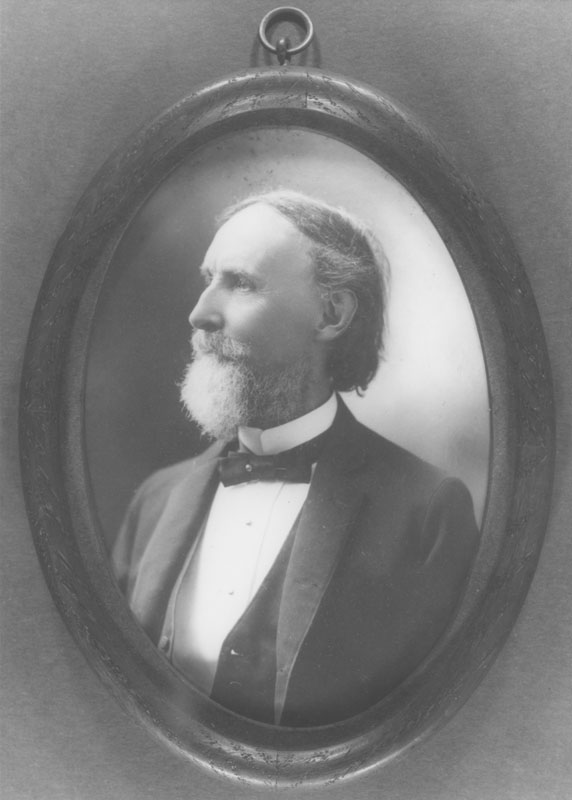
- Glassell (c. 1868)
- Born: Andrew Glassell Jr. September 30, 1827; Orange County, Virginia, U.S.
- Died: January 28, 1901 (aged 73); Los Angeles, California, U.S.
- Resting place: Angelus-Rosedale Cemetery; Los Angeles, California, U.S.
- Education: University of Alabama School of Law
- Occupations: real estate attorney; investor
- Known for: Founder of Orange, California
- Spouses: Lucy Toland (m. 1857; died 1879) Virginia Micou Ring (m. 1885; died 1895)
- Relatives: Susan Thornton Glassell (sister)

Andrew Glassell Jr. (September 30, 1827 – January 28, 1901) was an American real estate attorney and investor. He was one of the founders of the city of Orange, California.

== Early life ==
Glassell was born in Orange County, Virginia. Glassell's parents were Andrew Glassell (1793–1873) and Susanna Thornton (1804–1836). In 1834 his family moved to Greensboro, Alabama, where his father engaged in cotton planting. Andrew was educated at University of Alabama School of Law, from which he graduated in 1848.

== Career ==
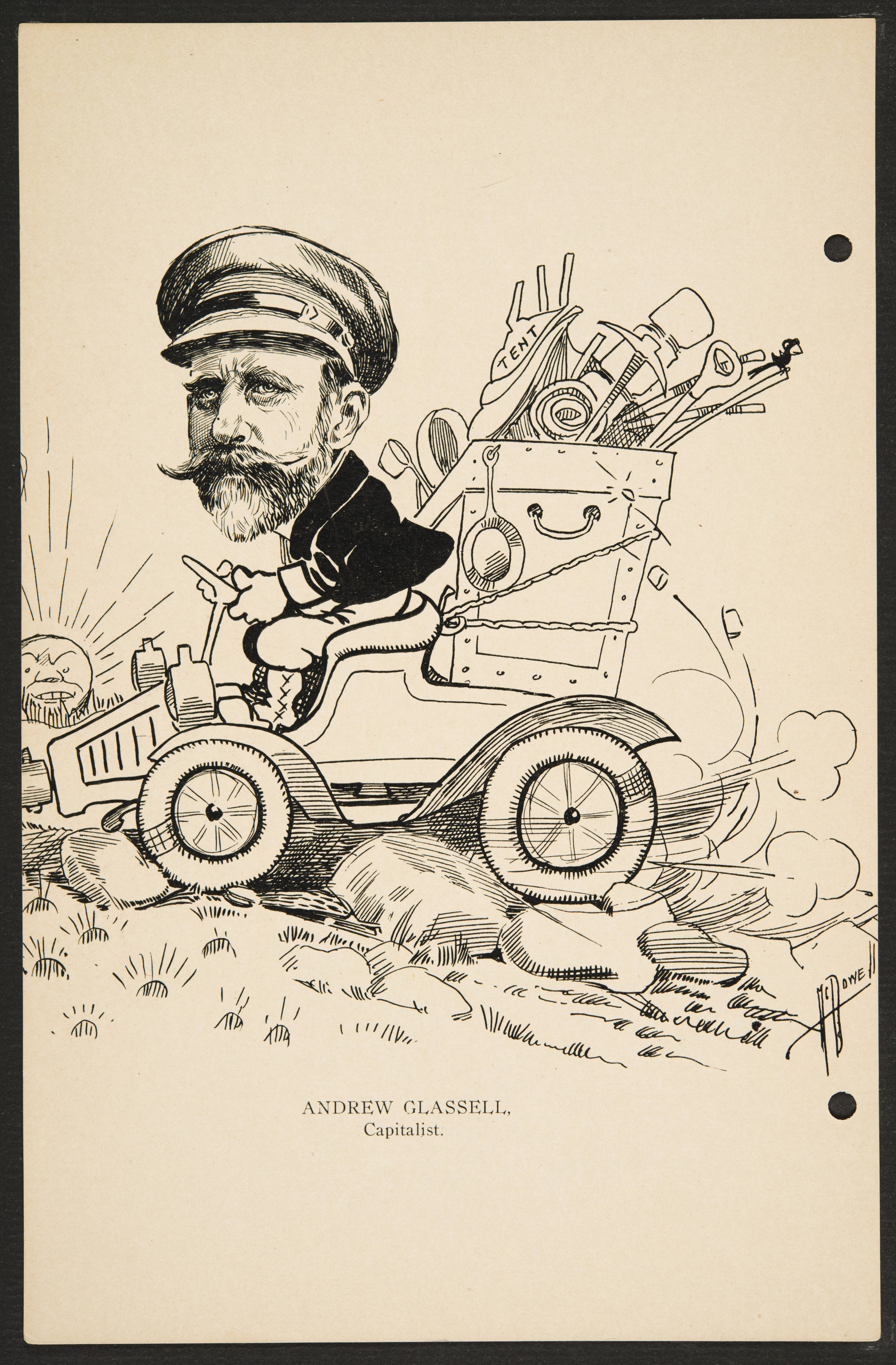
Caricature of Andrew Glassell c.1904-1911

In 1853, Glassell moved to San Francisco and established a law practice. His appointment as the United States attorney at Sacramento, California soon followed. During the Civil War his sympathies were with the South, and he refused to take the loyalty oath to the United States required of lawyers. He left his public office and quit the practice of law and operated a lumber mill near Santa Cruz.

== Los Angeles legal practice ==
After the war, Glassell came to Los Angeles in 1865. He formed a partnership with Alfred Chapman and Colonel George H. Smith, the firm becoming known as Glassell, Chapman & Smith. Their law practice was confined chiefly to real estate transactions and they made their fortunes by being retained in the large partition suits. When Glassell first came to California, he had worked with the federal land commission that reviewed all the old Mexican Rancho grants and so he was very well versed in title land law. Chapman was the businessman of the firm. They would take their compensation in land, and nearly every final decree in partition would find that Glassell and Chapman had quite an area of land in severalty. Glassell was involved in the legal suit known as The Great Partition of 1871 brought against the Rancho San Rafael property in the eastern San Fernando Valley and Verdugo Mountains. The section he and Chapman were awarded later became the community of Glassell Park, Los Angeles. In 1875 Andrew Glassell purchased Rancho Tujunga, the adjacent northern rancho in the Valley, from Agustin Olvera.

Andrew Glassell was one of the incorporators of and attorney for the Farmers and Merchants' Bank. He was the first president of the Los Angeles County Bar Association in 1878 - 1880. He incorporated the 'Los Angeles and San Pedro Railroad,' and was prominent in its management until it was absorbed by the Southern Pacific Railroad. When this transfer was made he became chief counsel of the S.P. railroad company in Southern California, and remained in that capacity until he retired in 1883.

== Orange, California ==
Glassell, Chapman & Smith looked after the interests of the Yorba family of the Rancho Santiago de Santa Ana, and when after a drought, the final settlement was reached there was not enough cash to satisfy attorney fees. Reluctantly a few thousand acres of land were taken in payment, and Chapman and Glassell came into possession of the land on which the City of Orange, California was built.

In 1872, the Richland Farm Tract (later Orange) subdivision was placed on the market by Andrew Glassell. Glassell and Chapman employed the former's younger brother, Captain William T. Glassell to plot the town site. Captain Glassell surveyed a section of land for his brother and Chapman in 1871. He divided the tract into 60 10-acre (40,000 m^{2}) lots surrounding a 40-acre (160,000 m^{2}) town site, which he called Richland after his father's plantation's name, and served as sales agent for the property. In 1873, when a post office was sought for the village it was discovered that there was a town in Sacramento County by the name of Richland. As an alternative, Orange was chosen in honor of Andrew Glassell's home county.

== Personal life ==
Andrew Glassell's widowed sister Susan Thornton Glassell, the paternal grandmother of General George Patton, came to live with him in Los Angeles.

In 1857, Andrew Glassell married Lucy Toland (1838 - 1879), daughter of H. H. Toland, a pioneer physician of San Francisco. Several children were born to this union. After her death, he married Mrs. Virginia Micou Ring (1836–1895) of New Orleans in 1885. Glassell died at his home in Los Angeles at age 73, and is interred at Angelus-Rosedale Cemetery in central Los Angeles.

=== Legacy ===
The Glassell Park neighborhood in Los Angeles, and Glassell Street in Orange County, California are named for him.
