= 7th Virginia Infantry Regiment =

- Flag of Virginia, 1861
- Active: May 1861 – Spring 1865
- Disbanded: April 1865
- Country: Confederacy
- Allegiance: Confederate States of America
- Branch: Confederate States Army
- Role: Infantry
- Engagements: First Battle of Bull Run; Battle of Williamsburg; Battle of Glendale; Second Battle of Bull Run; Battle of Fredericksburg; Battle of Gettysburg; Siege of Petersburg; Battle of Five Forks; Battle of Sailor's Creek

Commanders
- Notable commanders: Colonel James L. Kemper; Colonel Waller T. Patton

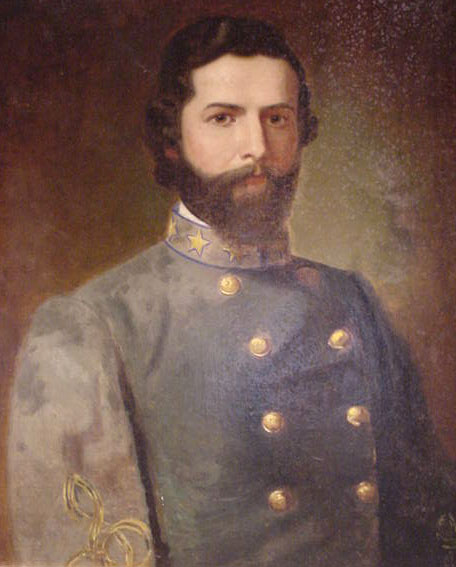
Col. Waller Tazewell Patton by William D. Washington.

The 7th Virginia Infantry Regiment was an infantry regiment raised in Virginia for service in the Confederate States Army during the American Civil War. It fought mostly with the Army of Northern Virginia.

The 7th Virginia was organized in May, 1861, at Manassas Junction, Virginia, with men from Giles, Madison, Rappahannock, Culpeper, Greene, Mercer, Monroe and Albemarle counties.

It fought at First Manassas under General Jubal Early, then served with Richard Ewell, Ambrose P. Hill, James L.Kemper, and William R. Terry. In April, 1862, the regiment had 700 effectives and later was active in the various campaigns of the Army of Northern Virginia from Williamsburg to Gettysburg. It participated in Longstreet's Suffolk expedition, was prominent in the capture of Plymouth, then fought at Drewry's Bluff and Cold Harbor. The 7th continued the fight in the Petersburg trenches south of the James River and around Appomattox.

The regiment sustained 47 casualties at First Manassas, 77 at Williamsburg, 111 at Frayser's Farm, 59 at Second Manassas, and 4 at Fredericksburg. About 40% of the 335 engaged at Gettysburg were disabled. It lost 39 men at Drewry's Bluff, and many were captured at Five Forks and Sayler's Creek. Only 20 officers and men were present at the surrender at Appomattox Court House.

Its commanders were Colonels Charles C. Flowerree, James L. Kemper, and Waller T. Patton; Lieutenant Colonel Lewis B. Williams, Jr.; and Major Aylett A. Swindler.

== See also ==
- List of Virginia Civil War units
- List of West Virginia Civil War Confederate units
