= George S. Patton Sr. =

American lawyer

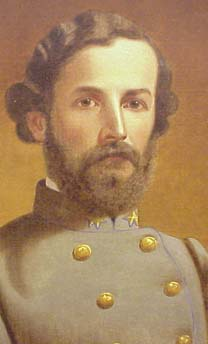
- Born: George Smith Patton; June 26, 1833; Fredericksburg, Virginia, U.S.
- Died: September 25, 1864 (aged 31); Winchester, Virginia, U.S.
- Burial place: Stonewall Cemetery, Winchester, Virginia
- Spouse: Susan Thornton Glassell
- Relatives: Waller Tazewell Patton (brother); George S. Patton (son); George S. Patton (grandson); George Patton IV (great-grandson)
- Military career
- Allegiance: United States of America; Confederate States of America
- Branch: United States Army; Confederate States Army
- Service years: 1852–61 (USA); 1861–64 (CSA)
- Rank: Colonel
- Commands: 22nd Virginia Infantry Regiment
- Conflicts: See battles: American Civil War; Battle of Scary Creek (WIA); Battle of Carnifex Ferry; Skirmish at Sewell Mountain; Siege of Cotton Hill; Skirmish at Giles Courthouse; Battle of Lewisburg; Jones-Imboden Raid; Battle of Fayetteville, VA (WV); Battle of Charleston; Battle of White Sulphur Springs; Battle of Droop Mountain; Battle of New Market; Battle of Cold Harbor; Battle of Lynchburg; Battle of Monocacy; Battle of Fort Stevens; Third Battle of Winchester †

Colonel George S. Patton Sr. (June 26, 1833 – September 25, 1864) was a Confederate colonel during the American Civil War. He was the grandfather of World War II General George S. Patton.

== Early life ==
George Smith Patton was born June 26, 1833, in Fredericksburg, Virginia, and raised in Richmond. He was the son of politician John Mercer Patton. George graduated from Virginia Military Institute (VMl), Class of 1852, second in a class of 24. After graduation, he studied law and practiced in Charleston, Virginia (now West Virginia). He married Susan Thornton Glassell in 1855.

== Civil War service and death ==
When the American Civil War broke out, he served in the 22nd Virginia Infantry of the Confederate States of America, rising from captain to colonel of the regiment. As lieutenant colonel he was wounded in the shoulder at the Battle of Scary Creek in present-day West Virginia on July 17, 1861. He returned but was again wounded at Giles Court House on May 10, 1862; this time in the stomach. At the Battle of Opequon, also known as the Third Battle of Winchester, he was mortally wounded and died September 25, 1864. He is interred at the Stonewall Cemetery in Winchester. The Confederate Congress had promoted Colonel Patton to brigadier general; however, at the time, he had already died of battle wounds, so that promotion was never official.

Patton had several brothers who also fought for the Confederacy, and one, Lt. Col. Waller T. Patton, another VMI graduate, was mortally wounded at Gettysburg on July 3, 1863.

== Legacy ==
Patton left behind a son, George William Patton, one of four children, who was born in 1856 in Charleston, Virginia (now West Virginia). To honor his late father, George William Patton changed his name to George S. Patton in 1868. Graduating from the Virginia Military Institute in 1877, this second-generation Patton served as Los Angeles County, California, District Attorney and the first city attorney for the city of Pasadena, California, and the first mayor of San Marino, California. He was a Wilson Democrat.

His home Elmgrove is now called the Craik-Patton House partly in his honor.

Patton's grandson was the famous World War II "Old Blood and Guts" General George S. Patton. His great-grandson was Major General George Patton IV, who died in 2004.
