= Waller T. Patton =

Confederate Army officer (1835–1863)

Waller Tazewell Patton
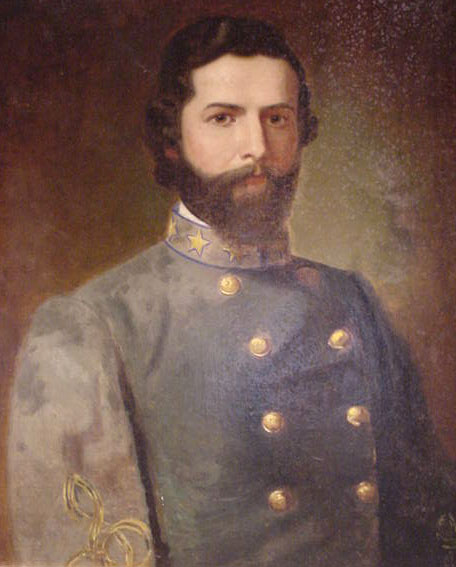
- Waller T. Patton by William D. Washington, 1868
- Born: July 15, 1835; Fredericksburg, Virginia, U.S.
- Died: July 21, 1863 (aged 28); Gettysburg, Pennsylvania, U.S.
- Burial place: Stonewall Cemetery, Winchester, Virginia
- Relatives: George S. Patton Sr. (brother); George S. Patton Jr. (grandnephew)
- Military career
- Allegiance: Confederate States of America
- Branch: Confederate States Army
- Service years: 1861–63
- Rank: Lieutenant Colonel
- Commands: 7th Virginia Infantry Regiment
- Conflicts: American Civil War; First Battle of Manassas; Seven Days Battles; Second Battle of Manassas; Battle of Fredericksburg; Siege of Suffolk; Battle of Gettysburg (DOW)

Lieutenant Colonel Waller Tazewell Patton (July 15, 1835 – July 21, 1863), was a professor, attorney, and an officer of the Confederate States Army during the American Civil War.

== Early life and career ==
Waller T. Patton was born in Fredericksburg, Virginia, into a well-known family. He was named for the Governor of Virginia, Littleton Waller Tazewell. His father, John Mercer Patton, a member of the Council of State, served as Acting Governor in March 1841. An ancestor, Hugh Mercer, served as a general during the American Revolution. His brother was Confederate colonel George S. Patton Sr.

Patton graduated from the Virginia Military Institute in 1855, placing 2nd in a class of 16. While still a student, he became a member of the faculty, serving as acting assistant professor of Latin from 1852 until 1854. Patton also served as lieutenant in the cadet corps and for a time, as assistant professor of languages and assistant. Following his graduation, Patton was hired as an instructor of tactics, and as assistant professor of mathematics and assistant instructor of tactics. He studied law and passed the bar exam, then established a profitable law practice in Culpeper, Virginia. He commanded a local militia unit, the Culpeper Minutemen.

== Civil War ==
With the outbreak of the Civil War and Virginia's subsequent secession, Patton enlisted in the Confederate Army in the spring of 1861 and was elected to serve as a major in the 7th Virginia Infantry. He was promoted to lieutenant colonel on April 27, 1862. Patton took command of the regiment in June 1862 following the promotion of the previous colonel, James L. Kemper, to the command of the brigade. He was badly wounded at Second Manassas on August 30, 1862, and spent the remainder of the year back home in Fredericksburg recuperating. Patton was elected to the Virginia Senate in 1863, but chose instead to return to his regiment.

His regiment served in North Carolina in the spring of 1863, then Patton led it northward during the Gettysburg campaign into Pennsylvania. On July 3, the 7th Virginia was in Pickett's Division, and as part of Kemper's Brigade, formed the right of the Confederate line during Pickett's Charge. Colonel Patton was mortally wounded while leading his men towards the Union positions on Cemetery Ridge. Part of his jaw had been ripped away by an artillery shell fragment. He died in a makeshift hospital at Pennsylvania College several weeks later. His first cousin, Lewis B. Williams, Jr, commanded another Virginia regiment in Pickett's Division and was also mortally wounded.

An older brother, George Smith Patton, was killed at the Third Battle of Winchester during the Valley Campaigns of 1864. Both George and Waller Patton are buried in the Stonewall Cemetery, a part of Mt. Hebron Cemetery, Winchester, Virginia. Four other brothers were officers in the Confederate States Army: Col. John Mercer Patton, Col. Isaac Patton, Lt. James F. Patton, and Lt. Hugh Mercer Patton.

Waller Patton was a great-uncle of American World War II General, George S. Patton.

== Memorialization ==
The Waller Tazewell Patton Camp #1661, Sons of Confederate Veterans, was named in his honor.

Media mogul Ted Turner made a cameo appearance in the 1993 film Gettysburg, playing Patton. He later reprised the role in the 2003 prequel Gods and Generals.

George and Waller Patton are buried in the Confederate section of Mt. Hebron Cemetery, Winchester, Virginia.
