= Senator Crockett =

Senator Crockett may refer to:

- Alexander G. Crockett (1862–1919), Virginia State Senate
- John H. Crockett (1864–1925), Virginia State Senate
- Pliny A. Crockett (1873–1958), Maine State Senate
- Robert O. Crockett (1881–1955), Virginia State Senate
- Samuel T. Crockett (1890–1946), Virginia State Senate
