= Action at Nineveh =

Action of the American Civil War

- Part of the American Civil War
- Warren County in Virginia
Date	November 12, 1864
Location	Warren County, Virginia
Result	Union victory

Belligerents
United States (Union)	(Confederate States of America) CSA (Confederacy)

Commanders and leaders
Br Gen William H. Powell	Br Gen John McCausland

Units involved
Second Cavalry Division 1st Brigade: 8 OH Cavalry; 14 PA Cavalry; 21 NY Cavalry; 2nd Brigade: 1 WV Cavalry; 3 WV Cavalry; 1 NY Cavalry	Lomax's Division McCausland's Brigade: 14 VA Cavalry; 16 VA Cavalry; 17 VA Cavalry; 21 VA Cavalry; 22 VA Cavalry; 62 VA Mtd Infantry; Lurty's Battery

Casualties and losses
17: 2 killed; 15 wounded; 0 captured/missing	216: 20 killed; 35 wounded; 161 captured

The Action at Nineveh was a cavalry action that occurred on November 12, 1864, during the American Civil War. A Union cavalry division led by Brigadier General William H. Powell defeated a Confederate cavalry brigade commanded by Brigadier General John McCausland. The fight took place in Nineveh, Virginia, near the road from Newtown to Front Royal, which is known as the Front Royal Pike. Nineveh is located in Virginia's Shenandoah Valley south of Winchester and north of the Shenandoah River in Warren County.

Powell's 1st Brigade was sent south on the Front Royal Pike to search for Confederate cavalry. Commanded by Colonel William B. Tibbits, the brigade encountered a portion of Confederate Major General Lunsford L. Lomax's cavalry commanded by McCausland. The Confederates slowly pushed the 1st Brigade back, but Tibbits sent a messenger to notify Powell of the situation. Repelling the attackers twice, Confederate leadership believed they had driven the Union cavalry away. Powell, riding with his 2nd Brigade, brought it to the front while the 1st Brigade moved to the rear. The 2nd Brigade charged, resulting in a short clash that ended with the Confederates being chased for 8 miles (12.9 km). Powell captured all of McCausland's artillery (two guns), the ammunition train, numerous small arms, and took over 150 prisoners.

Two men received the Medal of Honor for their undertakings in this action. Private James F. Adams from Company D of the 1st West Virginia Cavalry received his award for the capture of the state flag of the 14th Virginia Cavalry. Sergeant Levi Shoemaker from Company A of the 1st West Virginia Cavalry received his award for the capture of the flag of the 22nd Virginia Cavalry.

== Prelude ==
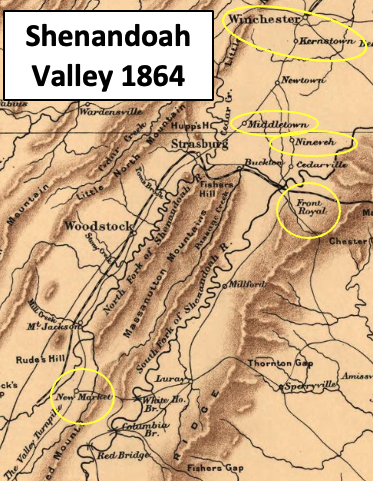
Winchester–New Market Region

On October 19, 1864, a Union army defeated a Confederate army in the Battle of Cedar Creek in the American Civil War. The battle took place in the Shenandoah Valley of Northern Virginia, near Cedar Creek, Middletown, and the Valley Pike. The Confederate Army, commanded by Lieutenant General Jubal Early, appeared to be victorious early in the battle. During the afternoon, Major General Philip Sheridan rallied his troops for a victory, and Union cavalry played an important role in both saving the army during the morning and the counterattack in the afternoon. Following the battle, Early's army reorganized further south at New Market, while Sheridan's army stayed on site until it moved north to Kernstown on November 9. (Note: In the 21st century, the Kernstown and New Market are 47 miles (76 km) apart via the interstate highway in Virginia. Middletown is ten miles (16 km) from Kernstown using the same interstate highway.)

At New Market, Early received reports from his scouts concerning Sheridan's November 9 movement. While Sheridan's purpose was to have a shorter line of supply and better winter quarters, Early believed that Sheridan could be detaching some of his troops to eastern Virginia. Early moved his army north from New Market to Middletown. Sheridan became aware of Early's movement before noon on November 12, and countered with his cavalry. On Sheridan's right (west), the Union cavalry divisions commanded by Brigadier General Wesley Merritt and Brigadier General George Armstrong Custer were sent south where they would oppose cavalry commanded by Major General Thomas L. Rosser. On Sheridan's left (east), Brigadier General William H. Powell was sent with his division south on the Front Royal Pike. His cavalry expected to oppose cavalry commanded by Major General Lunsford L. Lomax.

Rosser's cavalry was driven back and required assistance from Lomax. While a portion of Lomax's division left to provide the assistance, McCausland's brigade remained at Cedarville on the Front Royal Pike. McCausland's position enabled his cavalry to protect Early's troops at Middletown from having their Valley Pike escape route cut off if the Union cavalry was able to circle behind. Between Cedarville and Newtown on the Front Royal Pike was the small community known as Nineveh. (Note: Newtown has had several names, beginning with Stephensburg. The town was known as Newtown during the Civil War, and is now called Stephens City.) Located in Warren County, Nineveh is one of the county's oldest communities. Earlier in the 19th century it had been known as Stoney Point. (Note: Author George E. Pond spells "Stoney Point" as "Stony Point", and describes the action at Nineveh as happening "at Stony Point".)

== Opposing forces ==
=== Union ===
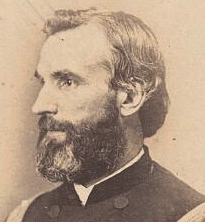
W. H. Powell

Brigadier General William H. Powell called his division Second Cavalry Division, Department of West Virginia, and on November 12 it consisted of two brigades.

- 1st Brigade was commanded by Colonel William Badger Tibbits of the 21st New York Cavalry Regiment. It consisted of three cavalry regiments: the 8th Ohio, 14th Pennsylvania, and the 21st New York cavalries.
- 2nd Brigade was commanded by Colonel Henry Capehart of the 1st West Virginia Cavalry Regiment. For the day's action, it consisted of three cavalry regiments: the 1st West Virginia, 3rd West Virginia, and 1st New York. The three regiments were commanded in this action by Major Harvey Farabee, Lieutenant Colonel John Lowry McGee, and Colonel Alonzo W. Adams, respectively. A fourth cavalry regiment, the 2nd West Virginia, was stationed in Martinsburg at the time and absent for the action. Capehart and the 1st West Virginia Cavalry had already fought in numerous battles in Virginia and West Virginia. They had been armed with Spencer repeating rifles since 1863. The 1st New York Cavalry was also very experienced, and by the end of the war it had participated in nearly 230 battles and skirmishes. It was also known as the "Lincoln Cavalry".

=== Confederate ===
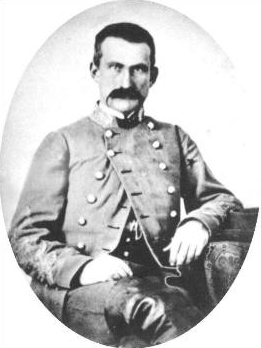
J. McCausland

Brigadier General John McCausland commanded the Confederate brigade in the action at Nineveh on November 12. He submitted a "brief report of the engagement" on November 13, and did not list the units under his command. The units listed below are based on Union Brigadier General William H. Powell's November 17 report. (Note: A newspaper article agreed with Powell's assessment of the participating Confederate units, but added three more units that were not part of the previous month's order of battle. In addition to the units listed by Powell, the newspaper also listed the 14th Virginia Infantry Regiment [not cavalry], 67th Virginia Cavalry Regiment and the 1st Maryland Cavalry "Regiment". A. different source says the 14th Virginia Infantry Regiment was serving in a different division near Petersburg, Virginia, at the time of the Nineveh action. There was no 67th Virginia Cavalry Regiment in existence during 1864. There was a 67th Virginia Militia Regiment formed in Berkeley County (then Virginia, later West Virginia) that disbanded April 1862. There was no 1st Maryland Cavalry listed in the previous month's order of battle, although there was a 2nd Maryland.) A year earlier, some of these units had been involved in the Battle of Droop Mountain, where the Confederate Army had been nearly surrounded—and fled the battleground in defeat as a second Union force threatened to cut off its escape route.

- 14th Virginia Cavalry Regiment - This regiment was listed as part of McCausland's Brigade (which was commanded by John McCausland) during the previous month at the October 19 Battle of Cedar Creek. It fought in the Battle of Droop Mountain.
- 16th Virginia Cavalry Regiment - This regiment was listed as part of McCausland's Brigade during the previous month at Cedar Creek. In addition to Cedar Creek, it had experience fighting in the Battle of Gettysburg. This regiment did not directly participate in the Battle of Droop Mountain, but it was part of the rear guard as the Confederate Army fled.
- 17th Virginia Cavalry Regiment - This regiment was listed as part of McCausland's Brigade during the previous month at Cedar Creek. In addition to Cedar Creek, it had experience fighting in the Battle of Gettysburg.
- 21st Virginia Cavalry Regiment - This regiment is listed as being part of Bradley T. Johnson's Brigade in the previous month's Battle of Cedar Creek.
- 22nd Virginia Cavalry Regiment - This regiment is listed as being part of Bradley T. Johnson's Brigade in the previous month's Battle of Cedar Creek.
- 62nd Virginia Mounted Infantry Regiment - This regiment is listed as part of Imboden's Brigade for the previous month's Battle of Cedar Creek.
- Lurty's Battery - This artillery battery had two guns (artillery pieces). It is listed in the order of battle for the previous month's Battle of Cedar Creek, and also fought in the Battle of Droop Mountain.

== Fight ==
Descriptions of the action at Nineveh differ somewhat on the cause of the victory. One point of view revolves around leadership and direct participation by the division commander, another blames negligence by Confederate leadership, and a third credits the size of the Union force. All points of view agree on the end result. (Note: An account given by the historian of the 14th Pennsylvania Cavalry differs from other accounts. It claims that the West Virginia regiments were used as a decoy by attacking and retreating, and then the 1st Brigade (led by Colonel Schoonmaker of the 14th Pennsylvania Cavalry) routed the enemy. No explanation is given on why this account differs from Powell's report, and no explanation is given for why two West Virginia soldiers from the 2nd Brigade captured battle flags.)

=== Union point of view ===
==== 1st Brigade ====
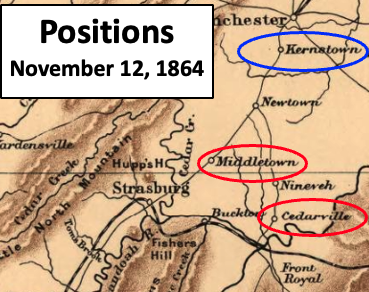
Sheridan moved to Kernstown and Early to Middletown

The morning of November 12 began with Powell's division resting near Winchester. Colonel Tibbits and his 1st Brigade began a probe south on the road to Front Royal. Near the small community of Nineveh, they began fighting with a Confederate brigade commanded by Brigadier General McCausland. The fighting did not go well for Tibbits' soldiers, and they began falling back. According to a letter written by Colonel Capehart, McCausland was using a "heavy line of dismounted skirmishers". An orderly was sent north to notify Powell of the situation.

Hearing the news, Powell immediately gathered his remaining available cavalry, which consisted of three regiments from Capehart's 2nd Brigade. They moved south on the Front Royal Pike at a trot. After about eight miles (13 km), they met Tibbits' brigade falling back in a hard fight. Powell formed the Second Brigade in battle formation, with the 3rd West Virginia Cavalry riding on the left, the 1st New York in the middle, and the 1st West Virginia on the right. The 1st Brigade passed to the rear in intervals, and then the 2nd Brigade moved to the front. McCausland's soldiers were posted on high ground with two well-posted artillery pieces.

==== 2nd Brigade attacks ====
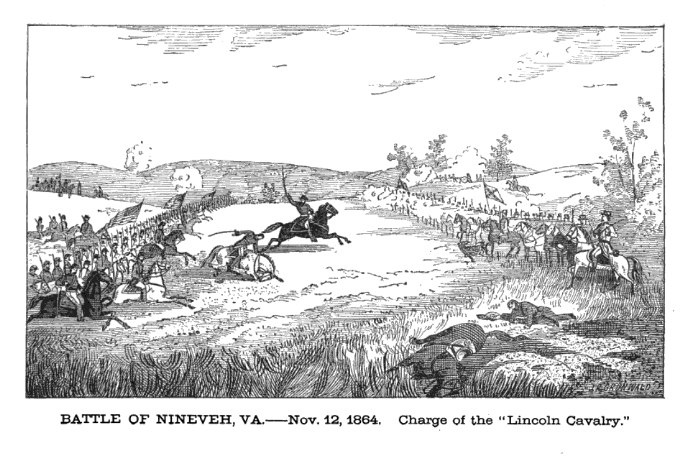
Charge by 1st New York (Lincoln) Cavalry at Nineveh

Powell was said to be on the field and guiding the battle formation. He instructed the two West Virginia regiments to move around the Confederates as if in a flanking maneuver, while the 1st New York maintained the front line. The New Yorkers charged and overran the Confederates, who either surrendered or retreated. At the same time, the two West Virginia regiments on the flanks moved toward the center. (Note: At least one Civil War historian believed that cavalry cannot be motionless in battle. It needed to charge or retreat. In the case of Nineveh, a large Confederate force was motionless—and did not perform well when attacked on three sides.)

Colonel Adams of the 1st New York was personally involved in apprehending the first of the two artillery pieces captured. Three companies from the 1st West Virginia Cavalry captured the other gun. The two artillery pieces captured were said to be 12-pounder howitzers.

The Confederates were chased south across both branches of the Shenandoah River and through the town of Front Royal—a distance of about eight miles (13 km) that was covered by the faster horses in 40 minutes. The chase was led by Colonel Adams of the 1st New York and a lieutenant from Capehart's staff. Those with slower horses picked up prisoners and abandoned Confederate property. Union Major General Alfred T.A. Torbert reported that the Confederates were pursued two miles (3.2 km) south of Front Royal.

=== Confederate point of view ===
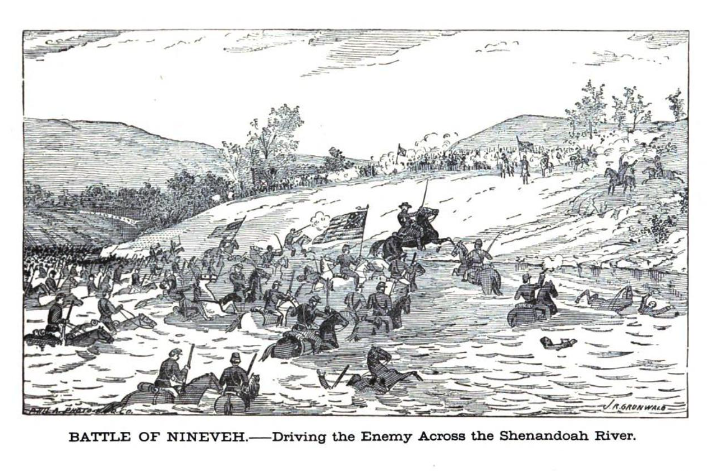
Union pursuit of Confederates across Shenandoah River

==== Hotchkiss and Early ====
The journal of Confederate Captain Jedediah Hotchkiss' describes the Action at Nineveh as happening "late in the p.m." at Cedarville. It concluded that after repulsing two attacks, McCausland believed he had driven the Union cavalry away. McCausland's brigade paused to eat, and was caught unprepared by a third attack. McCausland was driven through Front Royal, and lost two pieces of artillery.

Two Union soldiers had experiences that agree with Hotchkiss. A soldier from Company E of the 1st New York Cavalry, which was positioned on the left end of the middle regiment, wrote about his company's reconnaissance mission before the 2nd Brigade attacked. He said that the Confederate soldiers "looked at us in astonishment, and did not fire one shot". On the Union right, a soldier from the 1st West Virginia Cavalry noted that McCausland's fighters were dismounted and stood without a skirmish line—something the Union soldiers thought "was strange".

At least one historian agrees that McCausland was caught unprepared as his soldiers relaxed, ate, and fed their horses. Robert K. Krick wrote that McCausland's soldiers ignored "the basic disciplinary and security measures necessary in disputed country". Lieutenant General Early punished some of the soldiers "for misbehavior before the enemy on Nov. 12th 1864" by publishing their names, having them forfeit their horses, and transferring them from the cavalry to the infantry.

==== John McCausland ====
McCausland's report agrees that two Union attacks were repulsed, and claims Powell's division was driven back two miles (3.2 km) until it was reinforced by a "command supposed to be a division". He said the Union force charged and broke his lines, and mentions the loss of two lieutenant colonels. He reported that his retreat ended at Front Royal, and the fight lasted from noon until 3:30 pm. His report also said that the "men and officers behaved with great gallantry".

== Aftermath ==
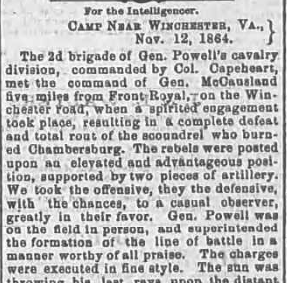
Beginning of newspaper account of the conflict

The November 12 confrontation at Nineveh has been classified as an action in Frederick H. Dyer's A Compendium of the War of the Rebellion. Two men from the 1st West Virginia Cavalry were awarded the Medal of Honor for actions in the fight. Private James F. Adams, from Company D, received his medal for "Capture of State flag of 14th Virginia Cavalry (C.S.A.)". The other medal winner was Sergeant Levi Shoemaker from Company A. His citation is "Capture of flag of 22d Virginia Cavalry (C.S.A.)". The performance of Capehart's 2nd Brigade did not go unnoticed. General Sheridan was soon calling it "the fighting brigade". Later in 1865, the nickname became "Capehart's Fighting Brigade".

Union casualties for the Nineveh action, plus actions fought by other cavalry divisions on the same day closer to Newtown, totaled to 184 killed, wounded or captured/missing. Powell's November 17 report listed his casualties (a subset of the 184) as two killed and 15 wounded.

Powell's November 17 report said Confederate casualties were 20 killed, 35 wounded, and 161 captured. In addition to the two artillery pieces, two caissons, two wagons, and one ambulance were captured. Fleeing Confederate soldiers also left numerous small arms behind. McCausland's November 13 report said 10 soldiers were killed, 60 were wounded, and 100 captured—but also said that he "cannot state exactly the number of men killed, wounded, and missing, and the above may be considered as the nearest approximation that can now be made."

A newspaper account, and Major General Torbert in his November 12 report, said McCausland was slightly wounded. Other Confederate casualties included Lieutenant Colonel John A. Gibson of the 14th Virginia Cavalry, who was wounded at Nineveh and left behind in Cedarville. That regiment's Major Benjamin Franklin Eakle was also wounded and captured on that day at Cedarville. The 22nd Virginia Cavalry's Lieutenant Colonel J. T. Radford was mortally wounded. A newspaper report claimed that Colonel Milton J. Ferguson of the 16th Virginia Cavalry leaped from his horse and ran into a woods to escape capture—losing his mount and equipment.

== Notes ==
=== References ===
- Beach, William Harrison (1902). The First New York (Lincoln) Cavalry from April 19, 1861, to July 7, 1865. New York: Lincoln Cavalry Association. p. 448. OCLC 44089779. "Nineveh Powell chased."
- Dyer, Frederick H. (1908). A Compendium of the War of the Rebellion. Des Moines, Iowa: Dyer Pub. Co. OCLC 1028851810. Archived from the original on December 23, 2022.
- Early, Jubal A. (1893). "Reports of Lieut. Gen. Jubal A. Early....". In Davis, George B.; Perry, Leslie J.; Kirkley, Joseph W. (eds.). The War of the Rebellion: a Compilation of the Official Records of the Union and Confederate Armies Series I Volume XLIII Part I. Washington, DC: Government Printing Office. pp. 554–567. OCLC 318422190.
- Heaton, Lynda Rees (Spring 2014). Heaton, Lynda Rees (ed.). "War Experiences of Samuel Wheeler, Private in the First West Virginia Cavalry Regiment, Part II". West Virginia History. 8 (1). Morgantown, West Virginia: West Virginia University Press: 65–88. doi:10.1353/wvh.2014.0003. JSTOR 43264984. Archived from the original on June 8, 2021.
- Hotchkiss, Jedediah (1893). "Journal of Capt. Jed. Hotchkiss....". In Davis, George B.; Perry, Leslie J.; Kirkley, Joseph W. (eds.). The War of the Rebellion: a Compilation of the Official Records of the Union and Confederate Armies Series I Volume XLIII Part I. Washington, DC: Government Printing Office. pp. 567–588. OCLC 318422190.
- Kalbian, Maral S. (1991). Rural Historic Resources Survey Report of Warren County, Virginia 1991 (PDF). Virginia Department of Historic Resources. Archived (PDF) from the original on 2024-10-07.
- Krick, Robert K. (1979). Lee's Colonels : A Biographical Register of the Field Officers of the Army of Northern Virginia. Dayton, Ohio: Morningside Bookshop. ISBN 978-0-89029-548-9.
- Krick, Robert K. (2004). The Smoothbore Volley That Doomed the Confederacy - The Death of Stonewall Jackson and Other Chapters on the Army of Northern Virginia. Baton Rouge, Louisiana: Louisiana State University Press. ISBN 978-0-80712-971-5. OCLC 149108272.
- Lang, Theodore F. (1895). Loyal West Virginia from 1861 to 1865: With an Introductory Chapter on the Status of Virginia for Thirty Years Prior to the War. Baltimore, MD: Deutsch Publishing Co. OCLC 779093.
- Lowry, Terry (1996). Last Sleep: The Battle of Droop Mountain, November 6, 1863. Charleston, West Virginia: Pictorial Histories Publishing Company. ISBN 978-1-57510-024-1. OCLC 36488613.
- McCausland, John (1893). "Report of Brig. Gen. John McCausland....". In Davis, George B.; Perry, Leslie J.; Kirkley, Joseph W. (eds.). The War of the Rebellion: a Compilation of the Official Records of the Union and Confederate Armies Series I Volume XLIII Part I. Washington, DC: Government Printing Office. p. 614. OCLC 318422190.
- Pond, George E. (1912). The Shenandoah Valley in 1864 Vol. 11. New York: Charles Scribner's Sons. OCLC 13500039. Archived from the original on October 7, 2024.
- Powell, William H. (1893). "Reports of Brig. Gen. William H. Powell....". In Davis, George B.; Perry, Leslie J.; Kirkley, Joseph W. (eds.). The War of the Rebellion: a Compilation of the Official Records of the Union and Confederate Armies Series I Volume XLIII Part I. Washington, DC: Government Printing Office. pp. 506–513. OCLC 318422190.
- Rhodes, Charles D. (1900). History of the Cavalry of the Army of the Potomac including that of the Army of Virginia (Pope's) and also the History of the Operations of the Federal Cavalry in West Virginia During the War. Kansas City, MO: Hudson-Kimberly Publishing Co. OCLC 5211713.
- Sheridan, Philip H. (1893). "Reports of Maj. Gen. Philip H. Sheridan....". In Davis, George B.; Perry, Leslie J.; Kirkley, Joseph W. (eds.). The War of the Rebellion: a Compilation of the Official Records of the Union and Confederate Armies Series I Volume XLIII Part I. Washington, DC: Government Printing Office. pp. 17–63. OCLC 318422190.
- Slease, William Davis; Gancas, Ron (1999) [1915]. The Fourteenth Pennsylvania Cavalry in the Civil War: A History of the Fourteenth Pennsylvania Volunteer Cavalry from its Organization until the Close of the Civil War, 1861-1865. Pittsburgh, Pennsylvania: Soldiers' & Sailors' Memorial Hall and Military Museum. ISBN 978-0-96449-529-6. OCLC 44503009.
- Snell, Mark A. (2012). West Virginia and the Civil War : Mountaineers are Always Free. Charleston, SC: History Press. ISBN 978-1-61423-390-9. OCLC 1051048067.
- Starr, Stephen Z. (2007). The Union Cavalry in the Civil War - Vol. II - The War in the East, from Gettysburg to Appomattox. Baton Rouge, Louisiana: Louisiana State University Press. OCLC 4492585.
- Stevenson, James H. (1879). Boots and Saddles: A History of the First Volunteer Cavalry of the War, Known as the First New York (Lincoln) Cavalry, and also as the Sabre Regiment. Harrisburg, PA: Patriot Pub. Co. OCLC 31947777.
- Torbert, Alfred T.A. (1893). "Reports of Brig. Gen. William H. Powell....". In Davis, George B.; Perry, Leslie J.; Kirkley, Joseph W. (eds.). The War of the Rebellion: a Compilation of the Official Records of the Union and Confederate Armies Series I Volume XLIII Part I. Washington, DC: Government Printing Office. p. 437. OCLC 318422190.
- Wallace, Lee A. (1986). A Guide to Virginia Military Organizations 1861-1865. Lynchburg, Virginia: H.E. Howard, Inc. ISBN 978-0-93091-930-6. OCLC 1003746760.
