= 3rd West Virginia Cavalry Regiment =

United States Civil War military unit

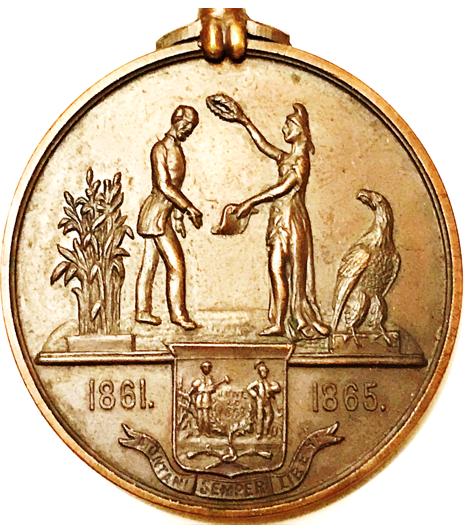
- West Virginia honorable discharge medal
- Active: December 1861 to June 23, 1865
- Country: United States
- Allegiance: Union
- Branch: Cavalry
- Engagements: American Civil War; Excluding detachments 1864: Lynchburg, Kernstown II, Moorefield, Third Winchester, Fisher's Hill, Action at Nineveh 1865: Waynesboro, Dinwiddie Court House, Five Forks, Namozine Church, Sailor's Creek, Appomattox Station, Appomattox Court House

Commanders
- Lt. Colonel: David H. Strother 1862–1864
- Colonel: John Lowry McGee 1864–65

The 3rd West Virginia Cavalry Regiment was a cavalry regiment that served in the Union Army during the American Civil War. Organization began in late 1861, but was not completed until late in the war. During 1862 and 1863, the regiment's companies were detached in groups of two or three to various theaters of operation, while the remaining companies often served as guards and scouts. The regiment was near full organization by the spring of 1864, and began fighting as a unit. It was often part of a brigade with the 1st West Virginia Cavalry and 2nd West Virginia Cavalry.

Lieutenant Colonel David H. Strother was the regiment's commander until the second half of 1864, but Strother never led the regiment in the field. Other leaders were John Lowry McGee, Seymour Conger, Lot Bowen, and John S. Witcher. McGee was the regiment's original major, and he eventually was commissioned as colonel. Conger, Bowen, and Witcher eventually became majors. Witcher was commissioned as a lieutenant colonel effective May 1, 1865. Captain Everton J. Conger of Company A, brother of Seymour, left for a different regiment in 1863—and was eventually involved in the capture of assassin John Wilkes Booth.

In 1864, the regiment had an important part in the Battle of Moorefield, where a surprise attack led by General William W. Averell routed Confederate cavalry. The regiment also fought in the latter part of General Philip H. Sheridan's Valley Campaign. It fought as part of Capehart's Fighting Brigade, in General George Armstrong Custer's 3rd Division, during the Appomattox campaign in 1865. The Fighting Brigade made important contributions to Union victories in the Battle of Five Forks and the Battle of Sailor's Creek. The brigade was present at General Robert E. Lee's surrender of the Army of Northern Virginia at the Battle of Appomattox Court House.

== Background and organization ==
=== Background ===
Fighting in the American Civil War began on April 12, 1861. Virginia seceded from the United States on April 17, 1861, and joined seven southern states (three additional states seceded later) in the Confederate States of America. In the northern and western portion of Virginia, many people (especially the non-slaveholders) preferred to remain loyal to the United States (a.k.a. the Union). Virginians loyal to the United States approved pursuing their own statehood on October 24, 1861, and the western portion of Virginia officially became the state of West Virginia on June 20, 1863.

During the Civil War and prior to the creation of West Virginia, both the Confederacy and Union had a 3rd Virginia Cavalry Regiment. Reports from Union officers made early in the war sometimes referred to the loyal regiments as Virginia regiments. (Note: The historian of the 2nd West Virginia Cavalry Regiment uses an original name for his regiment as "Second Regiment of Loyal Virginia Cavalry".) Adding to the potential confusion: the 3rd West Virginia Infantry Regiment became a mounted infantry regiment in 1863, and became the 6th West Virginia Cavalry Regiment in 1864.

=== Organization ===
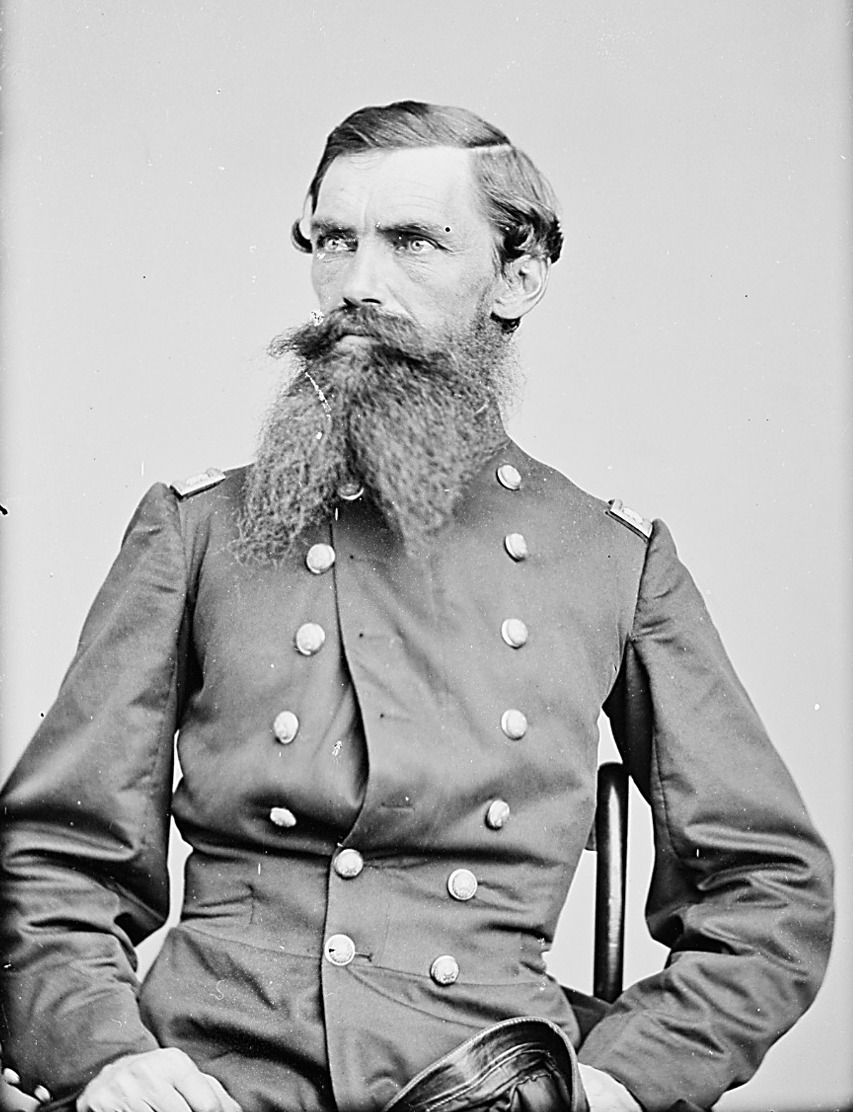
D.H. Strother

The 3rd West Virginia Cavalry Regiment was organized mostly between late 1861 and early 1862. (Note: Dyer's Compendium says organization was December 1861. Historian and soldier Theodore F. Lang says the regiment was "organized in the spring of 1862". The only officers Lang shows as commissioned in December 1861 are Everton J. Conger (captain, Company A) and Seymour B. Conger (first lieutenant, Company A).) The state of West Virginia did not exist prior to mid–1863, and correspondence dated July 19, 1862, refers to the regiment as "3rd Va Cavalry". Organization was not completed until 1865. (Note: The West Virginia Adjutant General's Report for the year ended December 31, 1864, shows Company L of the 3rd West Virginia Cavalry as not having a captain, first lieutenant, or second lieutenant.) The companies of the regiment spent much of 1862 and 1863 serving in detachments, and they did not serve all together until the early summer of 1864. For most of 1864, the regiment was part of the Second Brigade, 2nd Cavalry Division, Army of West Virginia. Beginning in February 1865, the regiment was part of the Third Brigade, 3rd Division, Cavalry Corps. It was present for the April 9, 1865, surrender of Confederate General Robert E. Lee's Army of Northern Virginia. The regiment mustered out June 23, 1865. (Note: Another source says that the last of the regiment was mustered out on June 30, 1865.)

Lieutenant Colonel David H. Strother was the original regimental commander. Strother never commanded the 3rd West Virginia Cavalry in the field. Most of his time was spent as a staff officer for various commanding generals, including Nathaniel P. Banks, John Pope, George B. McClellan, Benjamin Franklin Kelley, Franz Sigel, and David Hunter. Strother was promoted to colonel during 1863, and resigned from the army in 1864 after Hunter was replaced by Philip Sheridan. John Lowry McGee was the regiment's original major. McGee was previously captain of Company A (known as the Kelley Lancers) in the 1st West Virginia Cavalry Regiment, and had earned praise for leading a charge in an October 1861 action at Romney, (West) Virginia. The regiment had no other majors until late July 1863. Among other members of the regiment were brothers Everton and Seymour Conger of Company A, who began as captain and lieutenant of that company, respectively. Future congressman John S. Witcher was commissioned as a first lieutenant effective December 1862, and was a major commanding the regiment in the field by the end of the regiment's fighting. His commission as lieutenant colonel became effective May 1, 1865.

== Detachment action ==
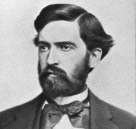
J. Lowry McGee

From the beginning through the winter of 1863, companies from the 3rd West Virginia Cavalry typically served as independent units. Groups of two or three companies served with several armies, while the remaining companies often served as escorts, guards, pickets, and scouts. (Note: An example of small detached action occurred from April 25, 1863 to May 14, 1863. Lieutenant Timothy F. Roane, from Company E, led 65 soldiers and 20 citizens against Confederate troops commanded by Brigadier General William E. "Grumble" Jones. The skirmishes happened near Clarksburg, (West) Virginia during the Jones–Imboden Raid.) Companies A and C often served together, as did Company D with Company E. Companies F, H, and I typically served together. During 1863, Major John Lowry McGee served on the staff of Major General Robert H. Milroy, who commanded the 2nd Division of the VIII Corps. McGee was commissioned as lieutenant colonel effective July 18. Effective July 29, Captain Lot Bowen (Company E) and Captain Seymour B. Conger (Company C) were commissioned as majors.

=== 1862 service ===
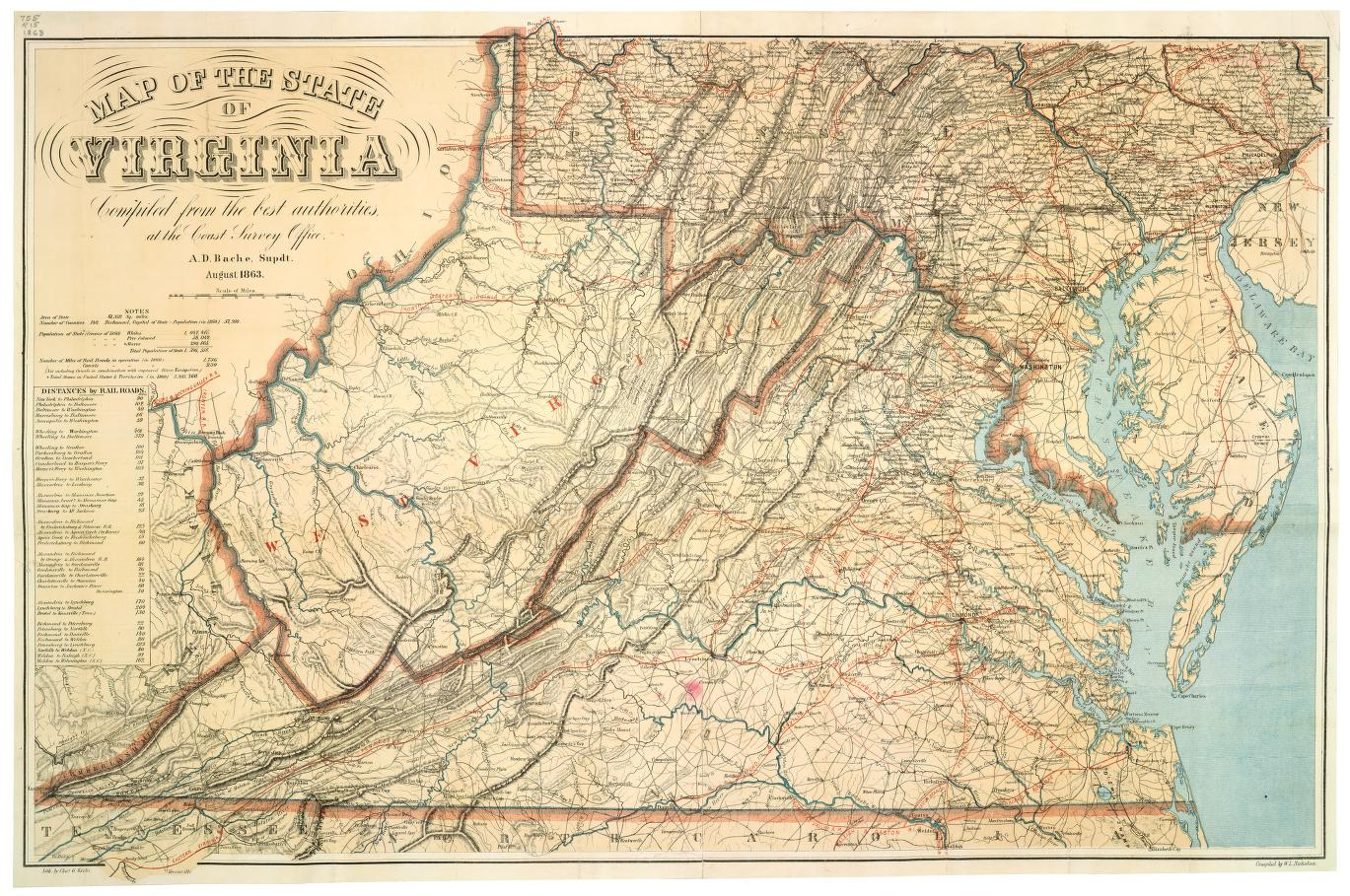
August 1863: West Virginia, Virginia, and surrounding area

The regiment's Company A and Company C served with the Second Brigade, 2nd Division, 1st Army Corps of the Army of Virginia until September 1862. Everton Conger and Jonathan Stahl are listed as the captain of Company A, and Company C, respectively, for that summer. "Captain Conger's company of Third Virginia Cavalry" is mentioned in a report as almost capturing Confederate "General Ashby" on June 3 near Mount Jackson, Virginia. There are two major battles during 1862 where the regiment is given credit for service.

- At the June 8 Battle of Cross Keys, a detachment, unattached to any brigade, had no reported casualties.
- At the August 30 Second Battle of Bull Run, the only participant from the 3rd West Virginia Cavalry was Company C, and it reported no casualties. The regiment's Company C, and Battery I from the 1st Ohio Light Artillery, were not attached to any brigade.

On October 24, 1862, a patrol led by the Conger brothers was attacked by a larger Confederate cavalry force near Catlett Station, Virginia. Captain Everton Conger was shot, slashed across the face, and left for dead. Lieutenant Seymour Conger was captured and sent to prison in Richmond. During the next month, Everton was paroled and Seymour was exchanged. Seymour was promoted to captain of Company C with a commission date of November 22. Everton did not return to active duty until July 1863.

=== 1863 service ===
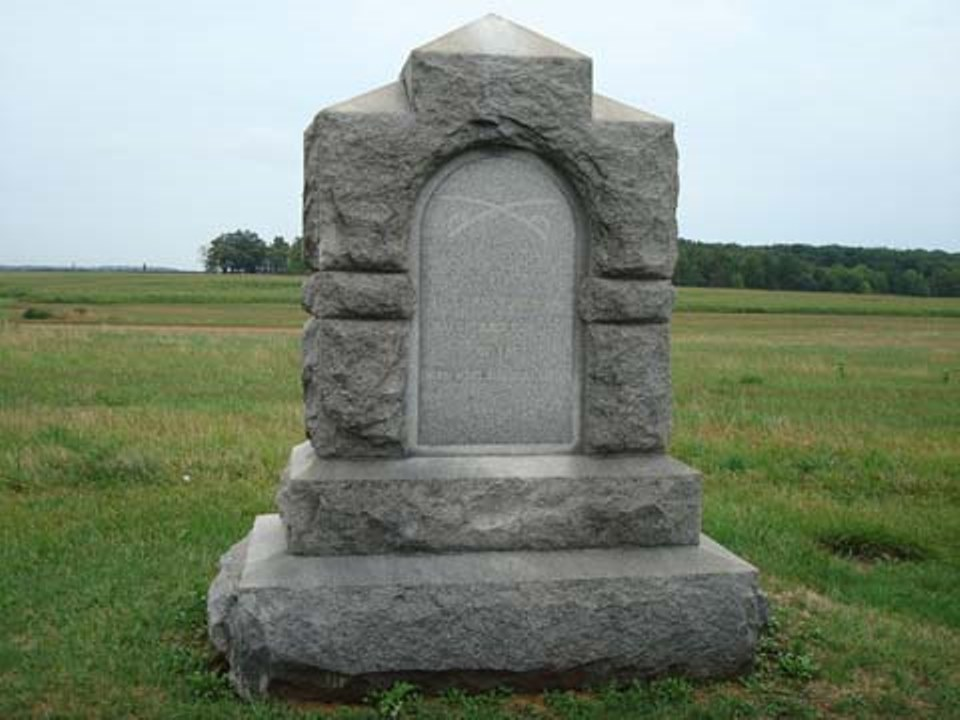
3rd West Virginia Cavalry monument at Gettysburg battlefield

Everton Conger left the 3rd West Virginia Cavalry during September 1863 to join the 1st District of Columbia Cavalry Regiment (a battalion until 1864) as a major. He resigned on February 8, 1865, as a lieutenant colonel, to join a detective service. After the assassination of President Abraham Lincoln, three detectives (including Conger) with 25 riders from the 16th New York Cavalry Regiment were involved in the capture of assassin John Wilkes Booth.

On May 16, 1863, Captain James R. Utt of Company D led a detachment that liberated 51 soldiers and captured 40 Confederates. Utt was killed during the action. At the time, he was the highest ranking officer in the regiment to be killed in action.

- At the Battle of Brandy Station on June 9, a 3rd West Virginia Cavalry detachment had three enlisted men wounded. The detachment, consisting of two companies commanded by Captain Seymour Conger, served in the Second Brigade of the 1st Division of the cavalry corps commanded by Brigadier General Alfred Pleasonton. The Second Brigade's commander was Colonel Thomas C. Devin.
- The Second Battle of Winchester occurred during June 13 to June 15. The regiment's Company D and Company E were detached to the Second Brigade, 2nd Division, of the VIII Army Corps. The brigade was commanded by Colonel William G. Ely. The two companies totaled to about 125 soldiers, and had casualties of one wounded and 71 missing. In this battle, Union forces were routed and had estimated casualties of 4,443 compared to only 266 for Confederate troops.
- In the June 21 Battle of Upperville, the 3rd West Virginia detachment that was the part of Devin's Second Brigade had no casualties listed.
- At the July 1–July 3 Battle of Gettysburg, two companies from the regiment were under the immediate command of Captain Seymour Conger as part of Devin's Brigade. Companies A and C were positioned near McPherson Ridge during their first day of fighting. The only known monument to the regiment is located in that vicinity.
- At the July 14 Battle of Williamsport (Falling Waters), the 3rd West Virginia Cavalry detachment in Devin's Second Brigade did not have any casualties.
- Companies A and C were at the Battle of Bristoe Station on October 14. For the period of October 9 through 19, those companies had three enlisted men killed and six captured or missing.
- On May 23, 1863, Brigadier General William W. Averell took command of the 4th Separate Brigade. This brigade was a mixture of infantry, mounted infantry, cavalry, artillery batteries; and portions of the force consisted of detachments. Included in this brigade were companies E, H, and I from the 3rd West Virginia Cavalry. Captain Lot Bowen, promoted to major effective July 29, commanded the three companies. In the November 6 Battle of Droop Mountain, those three companies were part of Major Thomas Gibson's Independent Cavalry Battalion that was used in the pursuit of the defeated Confederate Army at the end of the battle. According to Gibson's report, prior to the battle, Major Bowen and two companies from the 3rd West Virginia Cavalry were stationed elsewhere with dismounted soldiers and extra supplies.

=== 1864 service ===
- On May 10, 1864, a "detachment of the Third Virginia, under Major Conger" fought as part of a division commanded by Brigadier General Averell in the indecisive Battle of Cove Mountain near Wytheville, Virginia.

== Service as a brigaded regiment in 1864 ==
Early in the summer of 1864, the regiment began serving as a unit. John Lowry McGee continued as lieutenant colonel, and Seymour Conger and Lot Bowen continued as majors. Captain John S. Witcher, captain of Company E, had been promoted to major with a commission date of April 13, 1864. Later in the year, Lieutenant Colonel David H. Strother resigned on September 10, and Captain Charles E. Anderson was commissioned as major effective December 15.

=== Battle of Lynchburg ===
In Major General David Hunter's Lynchburg Campaign, including the Battle of Lynchburg on June 17 and 18, the 3rd West Virginia Cavalry Regiment was part of Averell's 2nd Cavalry Division, Department of Army of West Virginia. Although the regiment was designated as part of Colonel John H. Oley's Second Cavalry Brigade, it served as dismounted cavalry with the 2nd Infantry Division commanded by Brigadier General George Crook. Casualties for dismounted cavalry for the period of June 10 through June 23 were six killed, 23 wounded, and one missing or captured. Major Bowen resigned December 12, 1864, and a letter sent to Governor Boreman dated November 27 indicates Bowen was disabled during the Lynchburg Raid.

=== Second Battle of Kernstown ===
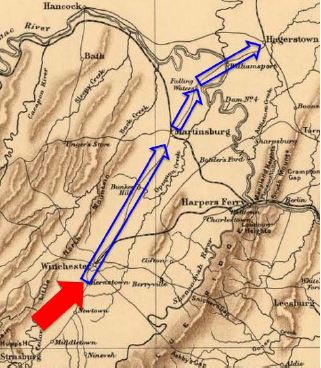
The Union Army fled north.

For the July 24 Second Battle of Kernstown, the regiment was part of Averell's 2nd Cavalry Division that was part of the Army of West Virginia commanded by Brevet Major General George Crook. The 1st, 2nd, and 3rd West Virginia Cavalry regiments comprised the Second Brigade that was commanded by Colonel William H. Powell. Crook underestimated the Confederate force he was facing, and marched cavalry and infantry up the Valley Turnpike. He sent Averell's division south on the Front Royal Road as part of an effort to get behind the Confederate Army. Crook was defeated, and his army retreated north.

Powell's Brigade and an infantry brigade led by Colonel Rutherford B. Hayes (future President of the United States) were among the few organized units remaining after the panic. They became the rear guard against the pursuing Confederate cavalry. The battle was over by the end of July 25, as all soldiers were soaked in cold rain. Crook retreated north across the Potomac River, and the Confederates reoccupied Martinsburg (in addition to controlling Winchester). The 3rd West Virginia Cavalry lost a total of 29 men killed, wounded, missing, or captured.

=== Battle of Moorefield ===
The Battle of Moorefield took place in Hardy County, West Virginia on August 7, 1864. Brigadier General William W. Averell led a cavalry force of roughly 1,700 that defeated two Confederate brigades totaling to about 3,000 soldiers commanded by Confederate Brigadier General John McCausland. The 3rd West Virginia, commanded by Major Seymour Conger, was part of Averell's Second Brigade that was commanded by Colonel Powell.

One week earlier, McCausland's Confederate cavalry burned Chambersburg, Pennsylvania, when the town was unable to pay a ransom. (Note: The Confederate raid was ordered by Lieutenant General Jubal Early, who justified the burning of Union towns as retribution for the burning of homes (and Virginia Military Institure) during June by Union Major General David Hunter in his Lynchburg Expedition.) Finishing their raid into Union territory, McCausland moved south and rested on August 6. Campsites were chosen for the purpose of grazing horses rather than defense. A brigade commanded by Brigadier General Bradley Johnson camped on the north side of the South Branch Potomac River, while McCausland's Brigade camped on the south side. McCausland established his headquarters further south in Moorefield.

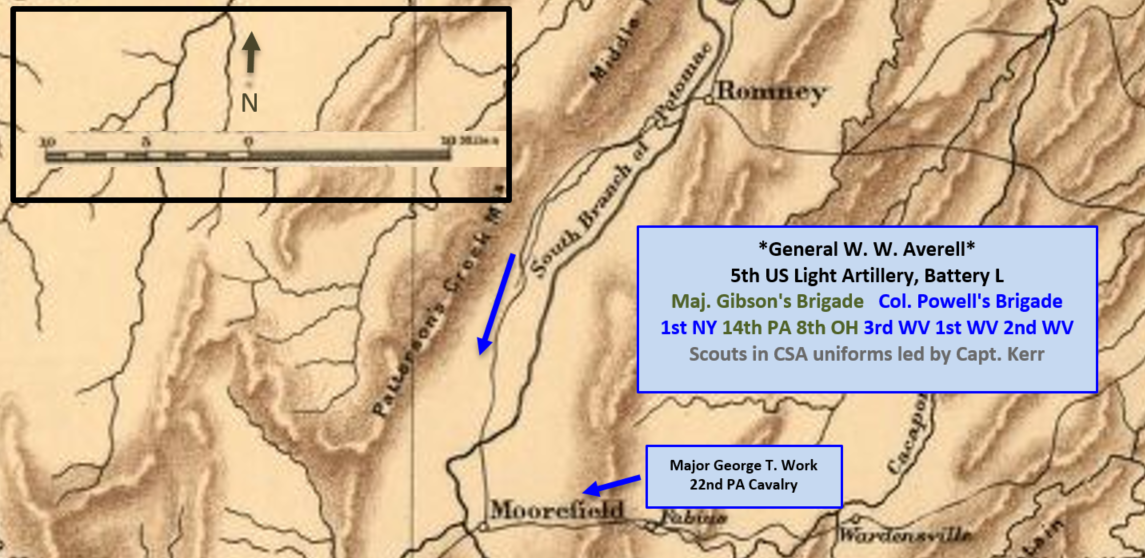
Averell's Union force quietly rode toward Moorefield. McCausland's Confederate Brigade camped on the Moorefield (south) side of the South Branch of the Potomac River, while Johnson's Confederate Brigade camped on the north side of the river. A Union detachment blocked the eastern escape route.

Early in the morning on August 7, Averell's First Brigade attacked Johnson's Brigade. The sleeping Confederate soldiers were attacked with sabers, and hundreds of them were captured. Although the attackers were very successful, they lost much of their "cohesion" by the time they reached the river as they chased the surprised Confederates in every direction. At this time Averell sent Powell's Brigade to attack the Confederate soldiers on the south side of the river. The 3rd West Virginia Cavalry, led by Major Seymour Conger, led this group of attackers across the ford. Soon Conger's cavalry was joined by Powell and the 1st West Virginia Cavalry, and the two regiments pursued the Confederates east down the road that led to Winchester.

During the pursuit, Conger was killed by a lieutenant from the 17th Virginia Cavalry. The Confederate Virginian was wearing a blue coat that fooled Conger into thinking he was from Conger's regiment. Also killed was Lieutenant Leonard Clark of Company E. Averell captured three battle flags, 420 prisoners, 400 horses, equipment and small arms, and a four–gun battery. According to Averell's report, the "number of killed and wounded of the enemy is unknown, but large." Confederate cavalry in the valley became half the size it was, had two of its better brigades decimated, and the remaining members were demoralized.

=== Winchester and Fisher's Hill ===
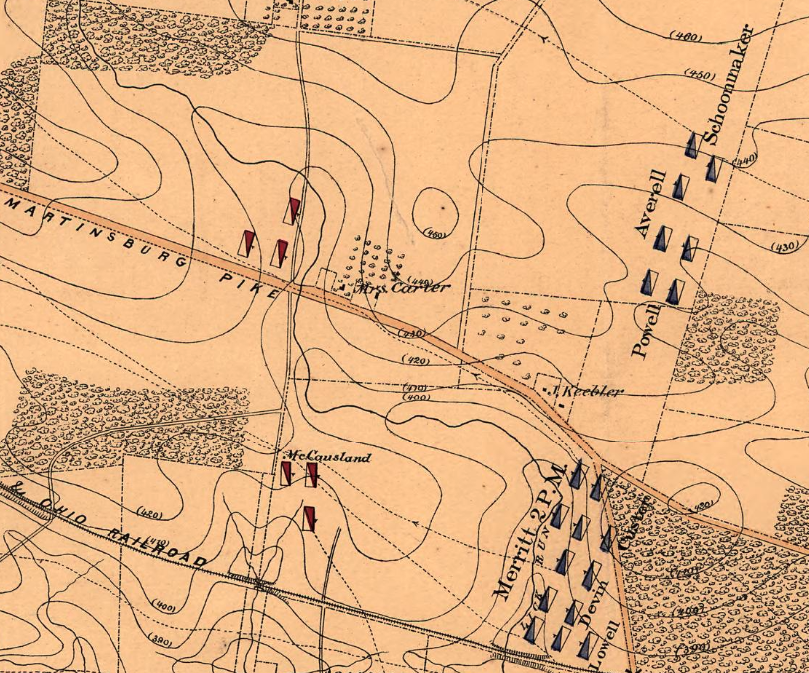
The 3rd West Virginia Cavalry was part of Powell's Second Brigade in Averell's 2nd Division, and it attacked Winchester from the north

On August 7, 1864, Philip Sheridan was appointed commander of all Union forces in the Shenandoah Valley as several military departments were combined into the Middle Military Division. Its army would be known as the Army of the Shenandoah. This army fought in the Third Battle of Winchester (also known as the Battle of Opequon) on September 19. The cavalry was commanded by Brevet Major General Alfred T.A. Torbert. The cavalry's 1st Division was commanded by Brigadier General Wesley Merritt, while Averell commanded the 2nd Division. The 3rd West Virginia Cavalry was part of the 2nd Division's Second Brigade. The regiment was commanded by Major Witcher. The Official Record lists Colonel Henry Capehart as commander of the Second Brigade, but other sources describe Colonel Powell as brigade commander.

In the battle, Averell's cavalry advanced from the north on the west side of the Martinsville Pike. Powell's Brigade was positioned on Averell's left, and it fought in cooperation with a brigade from Merritt's Division commanded by Brigadier General George Armstrong Custer. As Custer's men faced their enemy, Powell sent part of his brigade behind the Confederates facing Custer. The 3rd West Virginia moved to the Confederates left flank to cut off an avenue of retreat. The Confederates escaped by cutting toward a woods at Rutherford's farm, and they were pursued by the 3rd West Virginia and the 9th New York Cavalry. Eventually, the defeated Confederate army fled south on the Valley Pike. Casualties for the 3rd West Virginia Cavalry were one killed, two wounded, and one missing or captured.

The defeated Confederate Army was pursued from Winchester south to Fisher's Hill, where it had strong fortifications and an advantageous defensive location given the terrain. Sheridan wrote that the Battle of Fisher's Hill was somewhat of a continuation of the Winchester battle. The battle took place south of Strasburg on September 21 to 22. Lieutenant Colonel McGee commanded the regiment. By the morning of September 22, Powell's cavalry was fighting dismounted because of the terrain. Infantry commanded by George Crook had covertly flanked the Confederate Army, causing it to again flee south. Powell's cavalry was mounted and pursued the Confederates until 9:00 pm, taking numerous prisoners. Casualties for the regiment at Fisher's Hill were two killed, three wounded, and one missing or captured.

=== Cedar Creek and Nineveh ===
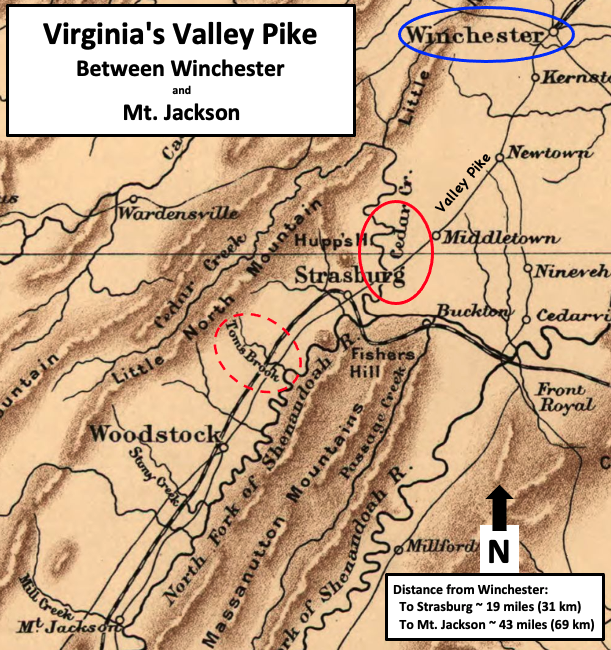
Most of Sheridan's army camped near Cedar Creek along the Valley Pike while Powell's Second Brigade was positioned further east to guard the Front Royal and Winchester Pike.

The Battle of Cedar Creek took place on October 19 in the Shenandoah Valley not far from the fighting that took place at Fisher's Hill, Kernstown, and Winchester. The 3rd West Virginia Cavalry is not listed in Dyer's Compendium as being present, yet it is listed in the Order of Battle in the Official Records. By this time, Colonel Powell was commanding the 2nd Division, Colonel Capehart was commanding the Second Brigade, and Lieutenant Colonel McGee is listed as the commander of the 3rd West Virginia Cavalry. Based on Powell's report, it appears Powell with his Second Brigade was communicating with Major General Torbert during the Battle of Cedar Creek, but positioned further east in area between Flint Hill, Front Royal, and Newtown. His First Brigade was elsewhere. His purpose was to prevent Confederate cavalry from getting behind the Union Army located at Cedar Creek. The Second Brigade repulsed Confederate skirmishers at South Branch Ford. There are no casualties listed for the 3rd West Virginia Cavalry, and only three for the Second Brigade.

On November 12 Powell's Division fought Confederate cavalry in the Action at Nineveh. This confrontation was classified as an "action", instead of a battle, in Frederick H. Dyer's A Compendium of the War of the Rebellion. Capehart commanded the Second Brigade, which consisted of (for this action) the 1st and 3rd Virginia Cavalries plus the 1st New York Cavalry. A soldier from the New York regiment listed Lieutenant Colonel McGee as leading the 3rd West Virginia Cavalry. The regiment was said to carry the Union left with "field officers leading in the charge". The result of the action was the Confederate force being chased "in great confusion" with over 200 casualties (including one colonel killed) and the loss of artillery and supply wagons. By the end of the year, Sheridan was calling Capehart's Brigade "the fighting brigade". Later in 1865, the nickname became "Capehart's Fighting Brigade" or the "Virginia Brigade".

== 1865 service ==
=== Shenandoah Valley ===
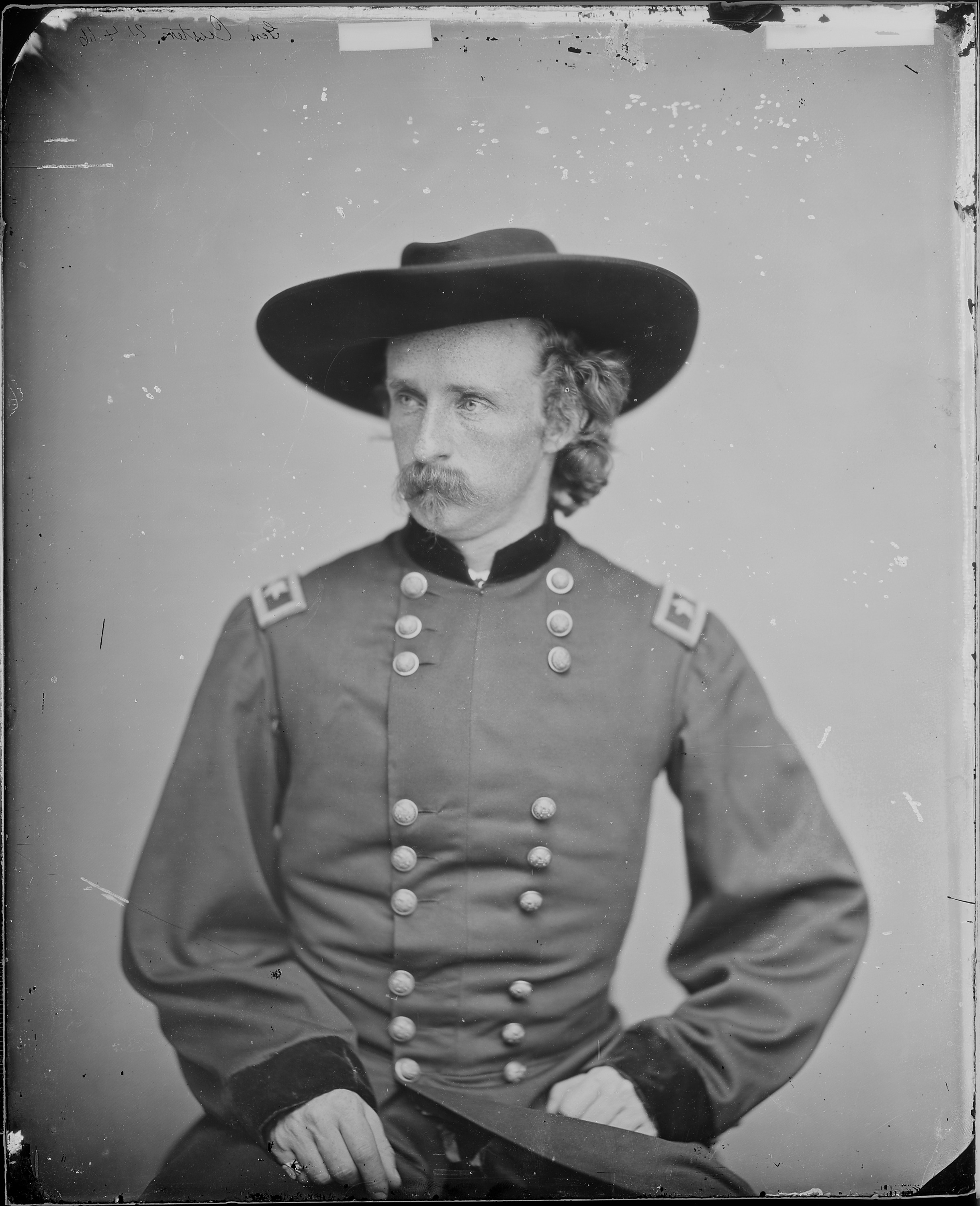
G.A. Custer

Sheridan's cavalry went into winter quarters at the start of the year. Powell resigned from the army during January, and his division camped on the Opequon River about five miles (8.0 km) from Winchester. Capehart's Brigade was transferred to Custer's Division. On February 27, Sheridan led two divisions (1st and 3rd) of cavalry up the valley. Grant wanted Sheridan to destroy the canal and railroads in all directions from Lynchburg because they were being used to keep Robert E. Lee's Army of Northern Virginia supplied. After the completion of that task, Sheridan was supposed to join the army commanded by Major General William Tecumseh Sherman in North Carolina. In Sheridan's army, the regiment was part of the Third Brigade, 3rd Division Cavalry Corps. Capehart was the brigade commander, and Custer was the division commander. The brigade consisted of the 3rd West Virginia Cavalry, a detachment of the 1st West Virginia Cavalry, seven companies from the 2nd West Virginia Cavalry, plus the 1st New York Cavalry. (Note: The 2nd West Virginia Cavalry had been reorganized into seven companies during early December 1864 because 240 soldiers had completed their three-year enlistment and mustered out.)

In the March 2 Battle of Waynesboro, Custer's Division encountered Lieutenant General Jubal A. Early and the remnants of his Army of the Valley. Most of Early's army was killed or captured in this battle, although Early evaded capture. Capehart's Brigade charged and cut off half of Early's force, causing a massive surrender. All of Early's headquarters equipment was captured. During a pursuit of the fleeing Confederates, Capehart's Brigade inflicted more Confederate casualties. That evening, the 2nd and 3rd West Virginia Cavalries captured a long wagon train of supplies and took over 100 more prisoners.

=== Appomattox campaign ===
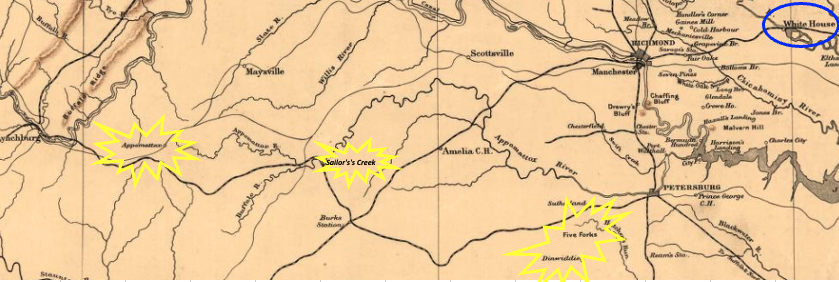
Portion of Virginia in the Appomattox campaign

Custer's Division reached Charlottesville on March 3, but faced delays caused by muddy roads. Rainy weather, swollen rivers, and destroyed bridges persuaded Sheridan that a link with Sherman in North Carolina was impracticable. His divisions were able to destroy infrastructure belonging to the Virginia Central Railroad and James River Canal.

Instead of moving toward North Carolina, Sheridan moved east to join Grant and the Army of the Potomac. Avoiding Confederate cavalry and infantry, Sheridan's divisions reached a Union Army base at the river port community of White House, Virginia, on March 18, 1865. At White House, the two divisions were resupplied, and rested for five days. Added to Sheridan's command was a 2nd Division of cavalry from the Army of the Potomac commanded by George Crook. Sheridan's command left its camp on March 24, and met the Army of the Potomac near Petersburg on March 27. Although Lieutenant Colonel McGee was the regiment's commander, Major Witcher is listed as the regiment's leader in the field for the Appomattox Campaign (March 29 - April 9).

==== Dinwiddie and Five Forks ====
In the Battle of Dinwiddie Court House on March 31, Confederate cavalry and infantry met the Sheridan's cavalry north and northwest of Dinwiddie, Virginia. Sheridan was driven back, and his movement was temporarily stalled. Capehart's Brigade was one of two brigades from Custer's Division that were rushed to the front and fought dismounted until they were relieved by infantry. Around sunset, charging Confederate cavalry was ambushed on its left flank by Capehart's Brigade. Confederate troops withdrew before daybreak because Union infantry was approaching from the east. They entrenched at an important road junction, Five Forks, and Confederate leadership expected the junction to be held.

The April 1 Battle of Five Forks was a Union victory, and over 4,000 Confederates were captured. The Five Forks area is where five good roads come together in a large forest. Sheridan's cavalry fought dismounted, keeping the enemy within the close range of their carbines—eliminating the advantage of the longer-range Confederate one-shot rifles. Late in the afternoon, Custer's men were mounted and charged the Confederate left and rear, first using their carbines but then switching to their sabers. Witcher and the 3rd West Virginia Cavalry charged a Confederate cavalry brigade and drove it away. Among the Confederate casualties was Colonel William Pegram, who was mortally wounded. Custer later attributed the success at this battle mainly to Capehart's Brigade and a brigade commanded by Colonel William Wells.

==== Sailors Creek ====
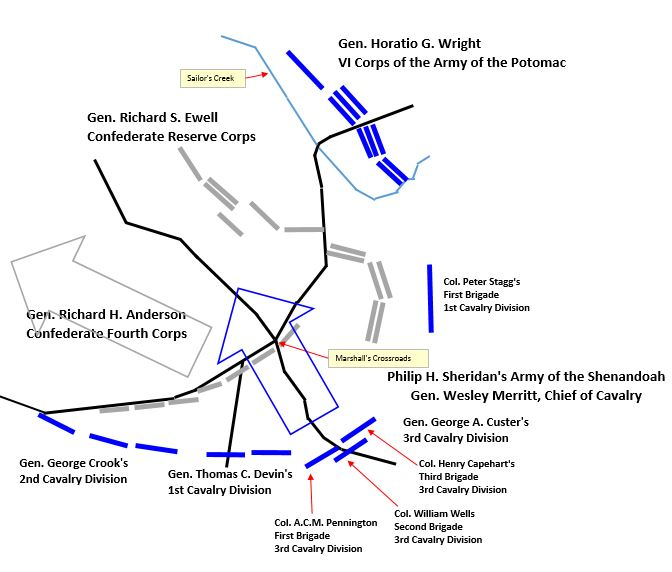
Capehart's Brigade helped surround Ewell's Corps

In the April 6 Battle of Sailor's Creek, nearly one fourth of the retreating Confederate Army was cut off, and most of those soldiers surrendered. The Union fighters were Sheridan's cavalry with portions of infantry from the II and VI Corps. Confederate General Robert E. Lee, watching the remnants of his army moving down the road, exclaimed "My God, has the army dissolved?"

During a pause in this battle Custer rode along the lines in plain view of the Confederate Army, and taunted his enemy with captured battle flags. The Confederates responded by taking numerous shots at this almost–out–of–range target, managing to hit Custer's horse but not Custer. Third Brigade commander Capehart realized that the Confederates would need time to reload their single-shot rifles, and requested permission for his brigade to attack immediately. Custer quickly agreed, and Capehart's Brigade charged the Confederate lines. Capehart's men used their sabers, carbines, and revolvers to move through three Confederate infantry lines.

A large portion of Confederate Lieutenant General Richard S. Ewell's corps became nearly surrounded, causing many of the soldiers to surrender. More than 8,000 Confederate soldiers, including eight generals, were killed or captured. (Note: The eight Confederate generals that were casualties in the battle were Seth Barton, Montgomery D. Corse, Dudley M. DuBose, Richard S. Ewell, Eppa Hunton, Joseph B. Kershaw, George Washington Custis Lee (Robert E. Lee's oldest son), and James P. Simms.) (Note: The American Battlefield Trust lists an estimated 8,830 Confederate casualties, while the U.S. National Park Service lists an estimate of 7,700. Historian Stephen Z. Starr says "between nine and ten thousand" were taken prisoner.) Custer later wrote that Capehart's Brigade handled "the brunt of the engagement". Historian Stephen Z. Starr wrote that Capehart's Brigade had the "most spectacular of the charges that broke the back of Confederate resistance...." The battle is considered the "death knell" for Lee's Army of Northern Virginia. Sergeant Walter F. McWhorter received the Medal of Honor for capturing the flag of the Confederate 6th Tennessee Infantry Regiment, and was the only member of the 3rd West Virginia Cavalry to receive that honor. (Note: McWhorter's Medal of Honor is listed as being awarded for capturing the flag of the Confederate 6th Tennessee Infantry. However, the National Park Service indicates that the 6th Tennessee Infantry "ended the war in North Carolina", and does not mention service in Virginia. The order of battle for Appomattox does not list the 6th Tennessee Infantry; it lists the 1st, 7th, 14th, 17th, 23rd, 25th, 44th, and 63rd Tennessee Infantry regiments.)

==== Lee surrenders ====
Prior to the Battle of Appomattox Station on April 8, Lee's army moved west along the Appomattox River. They hoped to receive food and supplies at the Appomattox station on the South Side Railroad before continuing southwest to escape the pursuing Union Army. Custer's Division captured the supply train before Lee could get to it, and Custer later wrote that Capehart's Brigade deserved "much of the credit due".

In the Battle of Appomattox Court House on April 9, Confederate General Robert E. Lee surrendered his army. Sheridan's 1st (Devin) and 3rd (Custer) Cavalry Divisions moved to high ground on the Confederate flank not far from the court house. Although preparations were made for an attack, it became unnecessary when fighting was suspended.

==== Appomattox campaign casualties ====
For the Appomattox Campaign, the 3rd West Virginia Cavalry had 11 casualties included in the total of 93 for Capehart's Third Brigade. Custer's entire 3rd Division (three brigades) had 355 casualties. Sheridan's three divisions of cavalry had a total of 1,472 casualties, while the Army of the Potomac had 7,763 and the Army of the James had 1,545. This makes a total of 10,780 Union casualties. Adding cavalry casualties from the Army of the James (one division plus unattached) to Sheridan's cavalry makes the total casualties for cavalry 1,630, or 15.1 percent of the total. Given that cavalry had only 8.3 percent of the Union force in the campaign, one could say that cavalry had a disproportionately high contribution to the results of the campaign compared to infantry and artillery.

== War's end ==
Custer's Division remained in battle line until the evening of April 9, and then went into camp. On the next day, they marched east toward Burkesville Junction, arriving on April 12. After resting for the night, they marched to Nottoway Court House, and received new clothing. The cavalry reached Petersburg, Virginia, by April 18, and camped outside the city. On April 24, the division started a march to North Carolina to join Sherman's army confronting the Confederate army of General Joseph E. Johnston. On April 28, not far from the Virginia–North Carolina border, they became aware that Johnston had surrendered. On the next day, the division began its return north.

=== Grand Review of the armies ===
Unknown cavalry in Grand Review of the Armies

The Grand Review of the Armies began on May 23, 1865, as a Union celebration of the end of the Civil War. Union troops paraded down Pennsylvania Avenue in Washington, DC. The parade was led by Custer's 3rd Division. The New York Times described men in Custer's division as "being decorated with a scarf or tie, known as the Custer Tie, red in color ..." It also said "Capehart's brigade of West Virginia Veterans, as trusty a body as ever drew a sabre, are singled out for their fine appearance ...."

=== Final muster out ===
Major Witcher was commissioned as lieutenant colonel effective May 1. John Lowry McGee was commissioned as colonel effective March 10, 1865. Charles W. White (Company B) and John L. Hurst (Company M) became majors with a May 23 effective date for their commissions. As of May 30, 1865, the regiment, part of the highly–regarded Capehart's Fighting Brigade, had 35 officers and 1,039 enlisted men. Losses during the war were six officers and 40 enlisted soldiers killed or mortally wounded, plus 136 soldiers died from disease.

In early June 1865, the 1st, 2nd, and 3rd West Virginia Cavalries were ordered to proceed to West Virginia to muster out. On June 17, the men and their horses were loaded onto a train where they departed for Wheeling, West Virginia. The three regiments camped on Wheeling Island between Wheeling and Belmont County, Ohio. The 3rd West Virginia Cavalry mustered out on June 23, 1865.

== See also ==
- Medals of Honor for West Virginia Soldiers
- West Virginia Units in the Civil War
- West Virginia in the Civil War

== Notes ==
=== References ===
- Averell, William W. (1889). "Reports of Brig. Gen. William W. Averell...operations May 22–July 28, 1863". In Scott, Robert N. (ed.). The War of the Rebellion: a Compilation of the Official Records of the Union and Confederate Armies Series I Volume XXVII - Part II - Reports. Washington, DC: Government Printing Office. pp. 205–211. OCLC 318422190.
- Averell, William W. (1893). "Reports of Bvt. Maj. Gen. William W. Averell...operations August 3 - September 23". In Davis, George B.; Perry, Leslie J.; Kirkley, Joseph W. (eds.). The War of the Rebellion: a Compilation of the Official Records of the Union and Confederate Armies Series I Volume XLIII - Part I - Reports. Washington, DC: Government Printing Office. pp. 493–506. OCLC 427057.
- Averell, William W. (1902). "Report of Brig. Gen. William W. Averell, U.S. Army, commanding Cavalry Division". In Ainsworth, Fred C.; Kirkley, Joseph W. (eds.). The War of the Rebellion: a Compilation of the Official Records of the Union and Confederate Armies Series I Volume XXXVII - Additions and Corrections. Washington, DC: Government Printing Office. pp. 41–44. OCLC 318422190.
- Averell, William W. (1902b). "Reports of Brig. Gen. William W. Averell...operations July 8 - August 3....". In Ainsworth, Fred C.; Kirkley, Joseph W. (eds.). The War of the Rebellion: a Compilation of the Official Records of the Union and Confederate Armies Series I Volume XXXVII - Additions and Corrections. Washington, DC: Government Printing Office. pp. 326–331. OCLC 427057.
- Beach, William Harrison (1902). The First New York (Lincoln) Cavalry from April 19, 1861, to July 7, 1865. New York: Lincoln Cavalry Association. p. 448. OCLC 44089779.
- Buford, John (1902). "Reports of Brig. Gen. John Buford....". In Ainsworth, Fred C.; Kirkley, Joseph W. (eds.). The War of the Rebellion: a Compilation of the Official Records of the Union and Confederate Armies Series I Volume XXIX - Additions and Corrections. Washington, DC: Government Printing Office. pp. 346–351. OCLC 318422190.
- Devin, Thomas C. (1902). "Report of Col. Thomas C. Devin, sixth New York Cavalry, commanding Second Brigade". In Ainsworth, Fred C.; Kirkley, Joseph W. (eds.). The War of the Rebellion: a Compilation of the Official Records of the Union and Confederate Armies Series I Volume XXVII - Additions and Corrections. Washington, DC: Government Printing Office. pp. 938–943. OCLC 318422190.
- Dyer, Frederick H. (1908). A Compendium of the War of the Rebellion. Des Moines, Iowa: Dyer Pub. Co. OCLC 1028851810.
- Fremont, John C. (1902). "Report of Maj. Gen John C. Fremont, U.S. Army, of operations March 29–June 27, 1862". In Ainsworth, Fred C.; Kirkley, Joseph W. (eds.). The War of the Rebellion: a Compilation of the Official Records of the Union and Confederate Armies Series I Volume XII - Additions and Corrections. Washington, DC: Government Printing Office. pp. 3–35. OCLC 427057.
- Gibson, Thomas (1902). "Report of Maj. Thomas Gibson, Fourteenth Pennsylvania Cavalry, commanding Independent Cavalry Battalion". In Ainsworth, Fred C.; Kirkley, Joseph W. (eds.). The War of the Rebellion: a Compilation of the Official Records of the Union and Confederate Armies Series I Volume XXIX - Additions and Corrections. Washington, DC: Government Printing Office. pp. 520–522. OCLC 318422190.
- Kelley, Benjamin F. (1881). "Report of Brig. Gen. Benjamin F. Kelley....". In Scott, Robert N. (ed.). The War of the Rebellion: a Compilation of the Official Records of the Union and Confederate Armies Series I Volume V. Washington, DC: Government Printing Office. pp. 378–380. OCLC 318422190.
- Lang, Joseph J. (1895). Loyal West Virginia from 1861 to 1865 : With an Introductory Chapter on the Status of Virginia for Thirty Years Prior to the War. Baltimore, MD: Deutsch Publishing Co. OCLC 779093.
- Lowry, Terry (1996). Last Sleep: The Battle of Droop Mountain, November 6, 1863. Charleston, West Virginia: Pictorial Histories Publishing Company. ISBN 978-1-57510-024-1. OCLC 36488613.
- MacCorkle, William Alexander (1916). The White Sulphur Springs; the Traditions, History, and Social Life of the Greenbriar White Sulphur Springs. Charleston, West Virginia: W.A. MacCorkle. OCLC 11083303.
- Milroy, Robert H. (1889). "Report of Maj. Gen. Robert H. Milroy...June 1–15". In Scott, Robert N. (ed.). The War of the Rebellion: a Compilation of the Official Records of the Union and Confederate Armies Series I Volume XXVII - Part II - Reports. Washington, DC: Government Printing Office. pp. 41–52. OCLC 318422190.
- Patchan, Scott C. (2007). Shenandoah Summer: The 1864 Valley Campaign. Lincoln, NE: University of Nebraska Press. ISBN 978-0-8032-0700-4. OCLC 122563754.
- Patchan, Scott C. (2013). The Last Battle of Winchester: Phil Sheridan, Jubal Early, and the Shenandoah Valley Campaign, August 7 - September 19, 1864. Havertown, Pennsylvania: Savas Beatie. ISBN 978-1-61121-064-4. OCLC 857365201.
- Peirpoint, Francis P. (1865). Annual Report of the Adjutant General of the State of West Virginia for the year ending December 31, 1864. Wheeling, West Virginia: John F. McDermot.
- Powell, William H. (1902). "Reports of Brig. Gen. William H. Powell...September 24–October 27 and November 12". In Ainsworth, Fred C.; Kirkley, Joseph W. (eds.). The War of the Rebellion: a Compilation of the Official Records of the Union and Confederate Armies Series I Volume XLIII - Additions and Corrections. Washington, DC: Government Printing Office. pp. 506–513. OCLC 427057.
- Rhodes, Charles D. (1900). History of the Cavalry of the Army of the Potomac including that of the Army of Virginia (Pope's) and also the History of the Operations of the Federal Cavalry in West Virginia During the War. Kansas City, MO: Hudson-Kimberly Publishing Co. OCLC 5211713.
- Roane (1902). "Report of Lieut. timothy F. Roane, Third West Virginia Cavalry, of operations April 25–May14....". In Ainsworth, Fred C.; Kirkley, Joseph W. (eds.). The War of the Rebellion: a Compilation of the Official Records of the Union and Confederate Armies Series I Volume XXV - Additions and Corrections. Washington, DC: Government Printing Office. pp. 96–97. OCLC 318422190.
- Sheridan, Philip Henry (1888). Personal Memoirs of P. H. Sheridan, General, United States Army – Volume II. New York: Charles L. Webster & Company. OCLC 703942811.
- Snell, Mark A. (2011). West Virginia and the Civil War : Mountaineers are Always Free. Charleston, SC: History Press. ISBN 978-1-61423-390-9. OCLC 829025932.
- Starr, Stephen Z. (2007). The Union Cavalry in the Civil War - Vol. II - The War in the East, from Gettysburg to Appomattox. Baton Rouge, Louisiana: Louisiana State University Press. OCLC 4492585.
- Stevenson, James H. (1879). Boots and Saddles: A History of the First Volunteer Cavalry of the War, Known as the First New York (Lincoln) Cavalry, and also as the Sabre Regiment. Harrisburg, PA: Patriot Pub. Co. OCLC 31947777.
- Strother, David Hunter; Elby, Cecil D. (1998). A Virginia Yankee in the Civil War: the Diaries of David Hunter Strother. Chapel Hill, North Carolina: University of North Carolina Press. ISBN 978-0-80786-666-5. OCLC 45843936.
- Sutton, Joseph J. (2001) [1892]. History of the Second Regiment, West Virginia Cavalry Volunteers, During the War of the Rebellion. Huntington, WV: Blue Acorn Press. ISBN 978-0-9628866-5-2. OCLC 263148491.
- Union Army (1908). The Union Army, Vol. 2: A History of Military Affairs in the Loyal States 1861-65, Records of the Regiments in the Union Army, Cyclopedia of Battles, Memoirs of Commanders and Soldiers; New York, Maryland, West Virginia and Ohio. Madison, Wisconsin: Federal Publishing Company.
- [Unlisted] (1885). "Return of Casualties in the Union forces, commanded by Maj. Gen. John Pope, during the operations August 16–September 2, 1862, inclusive at the battle of Cross Keys". In Scott, Robert N. (ed.). The War of the Rebellion: a Compilation of the Official Records of the Union and Confederate Armies Series I Volume XII - Part II - Reports. Washington, DC: Government Printing Office. pp. 249–262. OCLC 427057.
- [Unlisted] (1889). "Record of a Court of Inquiry convened to investigate the evacuation of Winchester and Martinsburg". In Scott, Robert N. (ed.). The War of the Rebellion: a Compilation of the Official Records of the Union and Confederate Armies Series I Volume XXVII - Part II - Reports. Washington, DC: Government Printing Office. pp. 88–201. OCLC 318422190.
- [Unlisted] (1902). "Return of Casualties in the Union forces at the battle of Cross Keys". In Ainsworth, Fred C.; Kirkley, Joseph W. (eds.). The War of the Rebellion: a Compilation of the Official Records of the Union and Confederate Armies Series I Volume XII - Additions and Corrections. Washington, DC: Government Printing Office. pp. 664–665. OCLC 427057.
- [Unlisted] (1902a). "Return of Casualties in the Union forces at Brandy Station...". In Ainsworth, Fred C.; Kirkley, Joseph W. (eds.). The War of the Rebellion: a Compilation of the Official Records of the Union and Confederate Armies Series I Volume XXVII - Additions and Corrections. Washington, DC: Government Printing Office. pp. 168–170. OCLC 427057.
- [Unlisted] (1902b). "Organization of the Army of the Potomac, Maj. Gen. George G. Meade...". In Ainsworth, Fred C.; Kirkley, Joseph W. (eds.). The War of the Rebellion: a Compilation of the Official Records of the Union and Confederate Armies Series I Volume XXVII - Additions and Corrections. Washington, DC: Government Printing Office. pp. 155–168. OCLC 427057.
- [Unlisted] (1902c). "Return of Casualties in the Union forces at Upperville, Va., June 21, 1863". In Ainsworth, Fred C.; Kirkley, Joseph W. (eds.). The War of the Rebellion: a Compilation of the Official Records of the Union and Confederate Armies Series I Volume XXVII - Additions and Corrections. Washington, DC: Government Printing Office. pp. 171–172. OCLC 427057.
- [Unlisted] (1902e). "Composition and Losses of the Union Forces June 10–23". In Ainsworth, Fred C.; Kirkley, Joseph W. (eds.). The War of the Rebellion: a Compilation of the Official Records of the Union and Confederate Armies Series I Volume XXXVII - Additions and Corrections. Washington, DC: Government Printing Office. pp. 103–106. OCLC 427057.
- [Unlisted] (1902f). "Return of Casualties in the Union forces, commanded by Bvt. Maj. Gen. George Crook at Kernstown...July 24–25". In Ainsworth, Fred C.; Kirkley, Joseph W. (eds.). The War of the Rebellion: a Compilation of the Official Records of the Union and Confederate Armies Series I Volume XXXVII - Additions and Corrections. Washington, DC: Government Printing Office. pp. 288–290. OCLC 427057.
- [Unlisted] (1902h). "Organization of the Union forces, commanded by Maj. Gen. Philip H. Sheridan...September 19". In Ainsworth, Fred C.; Kirkley, Joseph W. (eds.). The War of the Rebellion: a Compilation of the Official Records of the Union and Confederate Armies Series I Volume XLIII - Additions and Corrections. Washington, DC: Government Printing Office. pp. 107–112. OCLC 427057.
- [Unlisted] (1902i). "Return of Casualties in the Union forces, commanded by Maj. Gen. Philip H. Sheridan...September 19". In Ainsworth, Fred C.; Kirkley, Joseph W. (eds.). The War of the Rebellion: a Compilation of the Official Records of the Union and Confederate Armies Series I Volume XLIII - Additions and Corrections. Washington, DC: Government Printing Office. pp. 112–119. OCLC 427057.
- [Unlisted] (1902j). "Return of Casualties in the Union forces, commanded by Maj. Gen. Philip H. Sheridan...September 21–22". In Ainsworth, Fred C.; Kirkley, Joseph W. (eds.). The War of the Rebellion: a Compilation of the Official Records of the Union and Confederate Armies Series I Volume XLIII - Additions and Corrections. Washington, DC: Government Printing Office. pp. 120–124. OCLC 427057.
- [Unlisted] (1902k). "Organization of the Union forces, commanded by Maj. Gen. Philip H. Sheridan...October 19". In Ainsworth, Fred C.; Kirkley, Joseph W. (eds.). The War of the Rebellion: a Compilation of the Official Records of the Union and Confederate Armies Series I Volume XLIII - Additions and Corrections. Washington, DC: Government Printing Office. pp. 125–130. OCLC 427057.
- [Unlisted] (1902l). "Return of Casualties in the Union forces, commanded by Maj. Gen. Philip H. Sheridan...October 19". In Ainsworth, Fred C.; Kirkley, Joseph W. (eds.). The War of the Rebellion: a Compilation of the Official Records of the Union and Confederate Armies Series I Volume XLIII - Additions and Corrections. Washington, DC: Government Printing Office. pp. 131–139. OCLC 427057.
- [Unlisted] (1902m). "Organization of the Union forces, commanded by Lieut. Gen. Ulysses S. Grant". In Ainsworth, Fred C.; Kirkley, Joseph W. (eds.). The War of the Rebellion: a Compilation of the Official Records of the Union and Confederate Armies Series I Volume XLVI - Additions and Corrections. Washington, DC: Government Printing Office. pp. 564–580. OCLC 427057.
- [Unlisted] (1902n). "Return of Casualties in the Union forces, commanded by Lieut. Gen. Ulysses S. Grant, March 29–April 9, 1865". In Ainsworth, Fred C.; Kirkley, Joseph W. (eds.). The War of the Rebellion: a Compilation of the Official Records of the Union and Confederate Armies Series I Volume XLVI - Additions and Corrections. Washington, DC: Government Printing Office. pp. 581–599. OCLC 427057.
- Wert, Jeffry D. (2010). From Winchester to Cedar Creek: The Shenandoah Campaign of 1864. Carbondale, Illinois: Southern Illinois University Press. ISBN 978-0-80932-972-4. OCLC 463454602.
- Wittenberg, Eric J.; Mingus, Scott L. (2016). The Second Battle of Winchester - The Confederate Victory that Opened the Door to Gettysburg. El Dorado Hills, California: Savas Beatie, LLC. ISBN 978-1-61121-288-4.
- Wolfe, Richard A. (Spring 2016). "Custer's West Virginia Red Ties: The Life and times of the 3rd West Virginia Cavalry". Military Images. 34 (2): 12–17. JSTOR 24865689.
- Wolfe, Richard A. (Spring 2021). "Tracking Booth: Everton Conger went Down in History for his Role in Capturing John Wilkes Booth. Here's the Story of How He got There". Military Images. 39 (2 (216)): 43–47. JSTOR 26988442.
