= 22nd Virginia =

22nd Virginia may refer to the following American Civil War units:

- 22nd Virginia Infantry Regiment
- 22nd Virginia Infantry Battalion
- 22nd Virginia Cavalry
