= 14th Virginia Cavalry Regiment =

- Flag of Virginia, 1861
- Active: September 1862 – April 1865
- Disbanded: April 1865
- Country: Confederacy
- Allegiance: Confederate States of America
- Branch: Confederate States Army
- Type: Cavalry
- Engagements: Western Virginia Campaigns: Battle of Droop Mountain; Valley Campaigns of 1864; Battle of Five Forks

Commanders
- Colonel: Charles E. Thoburn 1862-1863
- Colonel: James Cochran 1863-1865

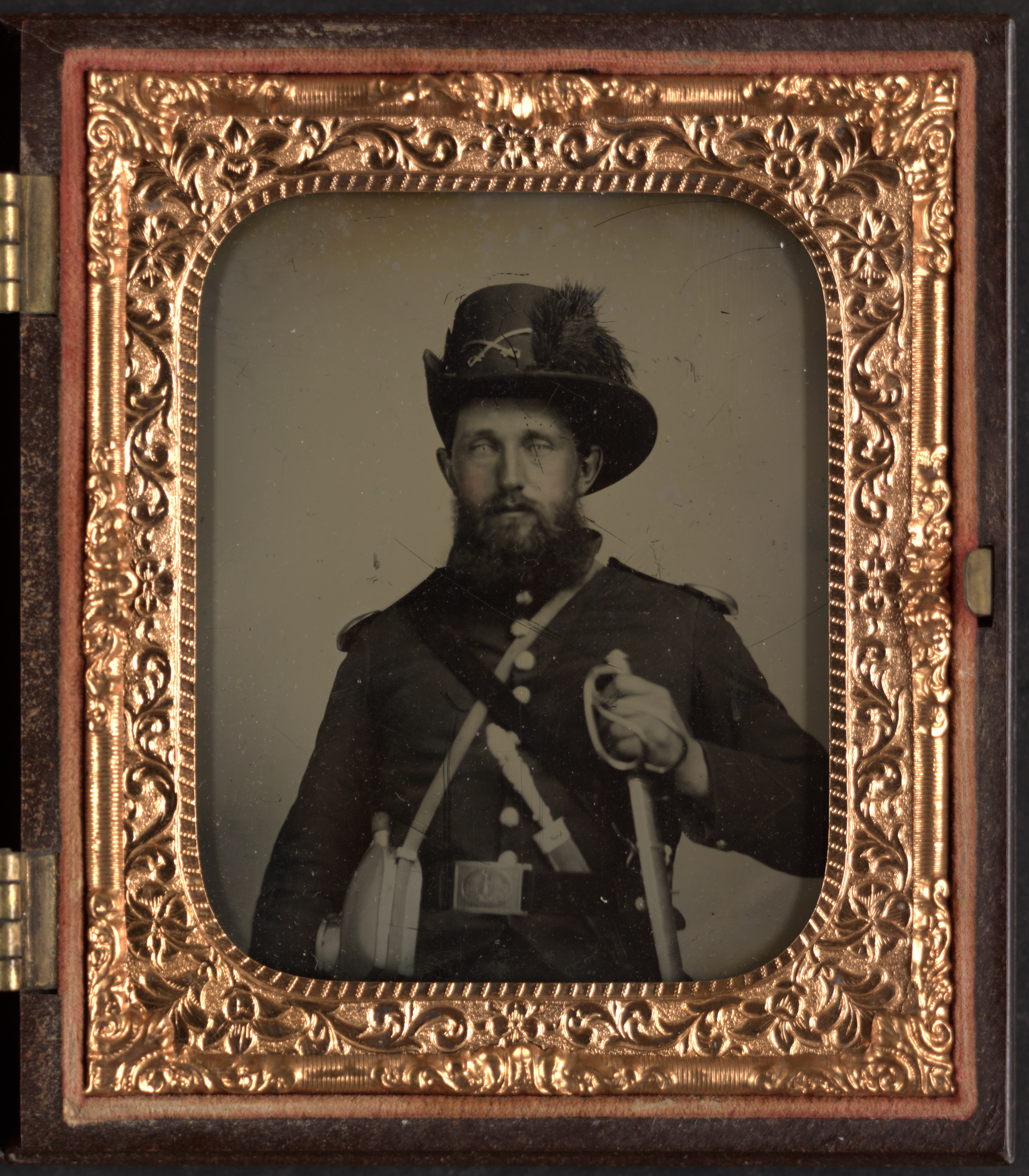
Second Sergeant John Hamilton Ervine of 14th Virginia Cavalry Regiment, Co. I, 1st Virginia Cavalry Regiment

The 14th Virginia Cavalry Regiment was a cavalry regiment raised in Virginia for service in the Confederate States Army during the American Civil War. The regiment was organized during September 1862, with nine companies, some of which had previously served in Jackson's Squadron Virginia Cavalry. The tenth company was made up of surplus men of the other companies. The men were recruited primarily from the counties of Greenbrier, Nicholas, Calhoun, Boone, Braxton, Roane, Jackson, Wirt, and Wood in what would become West Virginia, and the Virginia counties of Charlotte, Roanoke, Montgomery, Augusta, Rockbridge and Highland.

The unit was attached to Jenkins', Echols', and McCausland's Brigade. It skirmished in western Virginia, then saw action at Droop Mountain and Lewisburg. During January 1864, it had 29 officers and 424 men present for duty. The regiment took part in the operations in the Shenandoah Valley, and disbanded in April 1865. The field officers were Colonels James Cochran and Charles E. Thorburn, Lieutenant Colonels Robert A. Bailey and John A. Gibson, and Majors B. Frank Eakle and George Jackson. The regiment's flag was captured by Union Private James F. Adams of the 1st West Virginia Cavalry Regiment on November 12, 1864. For this action that occurred during an engagement at Nineveh, Virginia, Adams was awarded the Medal of Honor.

== See also ==
- List of Virginia Civil War units
- List of West Virginia Civil War Confederate units
