= Victor Nehlig =

American painter

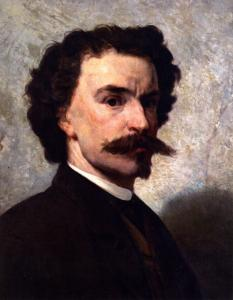
Self portrait

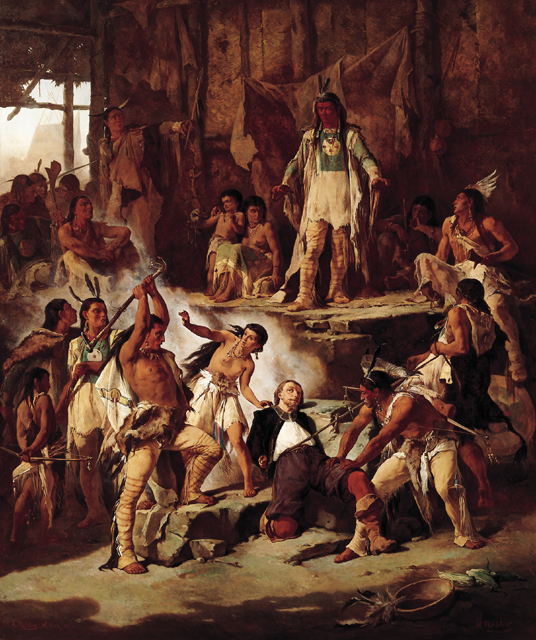
Pocahontas Saving John Smith (1870)

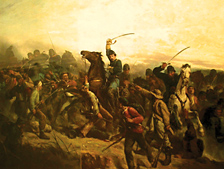
An Episode of the War (1875)

Victor Nehlig (1830, Paris – 1909, New York City) was a French-American painter.

== Life ==
Born in Paris in 1830, Nehlig studied painting under Léon Cogniet and Abel de Pujol. In 1850, he moved to the United States, where he would live and work for the next 22 years, interrupted only by a brief stay in Havana, Cuba. During his time in the United States, Nehlig opened a studio in New York City and painted a variety of works in the academic style, often demonstrating his prowess at depicting the human figure. Nehlig returned to his native France in 1872, two years after being elected an academician in the National Academy of Design and shortly after his studio and many of his reference materials were destroyed in a devastating fire. He died in 1909 in New York City.

== Works ==
While Nehlig was relatively well known among art enthusiasts during his time, his work has seen less attention in subsequent years. He frequently painted interpretations of American history, taking a special interest in scenes from the American Civil War, the effects of which he witnessed firsthand. An Episode of the War — The Cavalry Charge of Lt. Henry B. Hidden (1875), held in the collection of the New-York Historical Society's Henry Luce III Center for the Study of American Culture, and Pocahontas Saving Capt. John Smith (1870), held in the collection of the Museum of Art BYU, are among his only paintings on public display. A number of others exist in private collections.
