= 21st New York Cavalry Regiment =

Cavalry regiment in the American Civil War

21st Regiment New York Volunteer Cavalry
- Active: September 4, 1863 to August 31, 1866
- Country: United States
- Allegiance: (Union (American Civil War)) Union (New York (state)) New York
- Branch: Union Army
- Type: Cavalry
- Size: Regiment
- Engagements: American Civil War; 1864; Battle of New Market; Battle of Piedmont; Battle of Lynchburg; Second Battle of Kernstown; Action at Nineveh

Commanders
- Colonel: William B. Tibbits
- Major: Charles G. Otis
- Colonel: Charles Fitz Simmons

The 21st New York Cavalry Regiment was a cavalry regiment in the Union Army during the American Civil War. It was nicknamed the "Griswold Light Cavalry". The regiment began being formed during the late summer of 1863 in Troy, New York. During its service, the regiment had 66 soldiers killed or mortally wounded. Disease caused the death of 77 soldiers.

== Notes ==
=== References ===
- Dyer, Frederick H. (1908). A Compendium of the War of the Rebellion. Des Moines, Iowa: Dyer Pub. Co. OCLC 1028851810.
