= Henry B. Hidden =

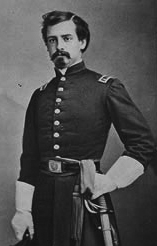
- 1st Lt. Henry B. Hidden
- Born: 1839; New York City, US
- Died: March 9, 1862 (aged 22–23); Sangster's Station, Fairfax County, Virginia, US
- Burial place: Green-Wood Cemetery; Brooklyn, New York, US
- Relatives: William Henry Webb
- Military career
- Allegiance: United States of America; Union
- Branch: Union Army
- Service years: 1861 – 1862
- Rank: First Lieutenant
- Unit: 1st Regiment New York Volunteer Cavalry
- Conflicts: -Sangster's Station †

Henry B. Hidden (c. 1839 – March 9, 1862), was a First Lieutenant in the Union Army during the American Civil War. Hidden is believed to be the first cavalry officer killed in action in the Army of the Potomac and the first officer of Union volunteer cavalry killed in the Civil War.

== Biography ==
Henry B. Hidden was born in New York City c. 1839 to a wealthy family related to the shipwright William Henry Webb. He enlisted in the Union Army on August 5, 1861, at New York City, and was commissioned a 1st Lieutenant of Company H, 1st Regiment New York Volunteer Cavalry, a regiment also called the "Lincoln Cavalry." On March 9, 1862, Hidden was ordered to take a small scouting party to investigate enemy activity near a bridge Union soldiers were building at Sangster's Station, a railroad station southwest of Fairfax Station, Virginia. Hidden and his party of 14 dragoons encountered an estimated 150 Confederate soldiers. Although vastly outnumbered, Hidden ordered a charge. In the resulting skirmish, he was shot in the neck and died soon afterward. The rest of the scouting party was wounded or captured.

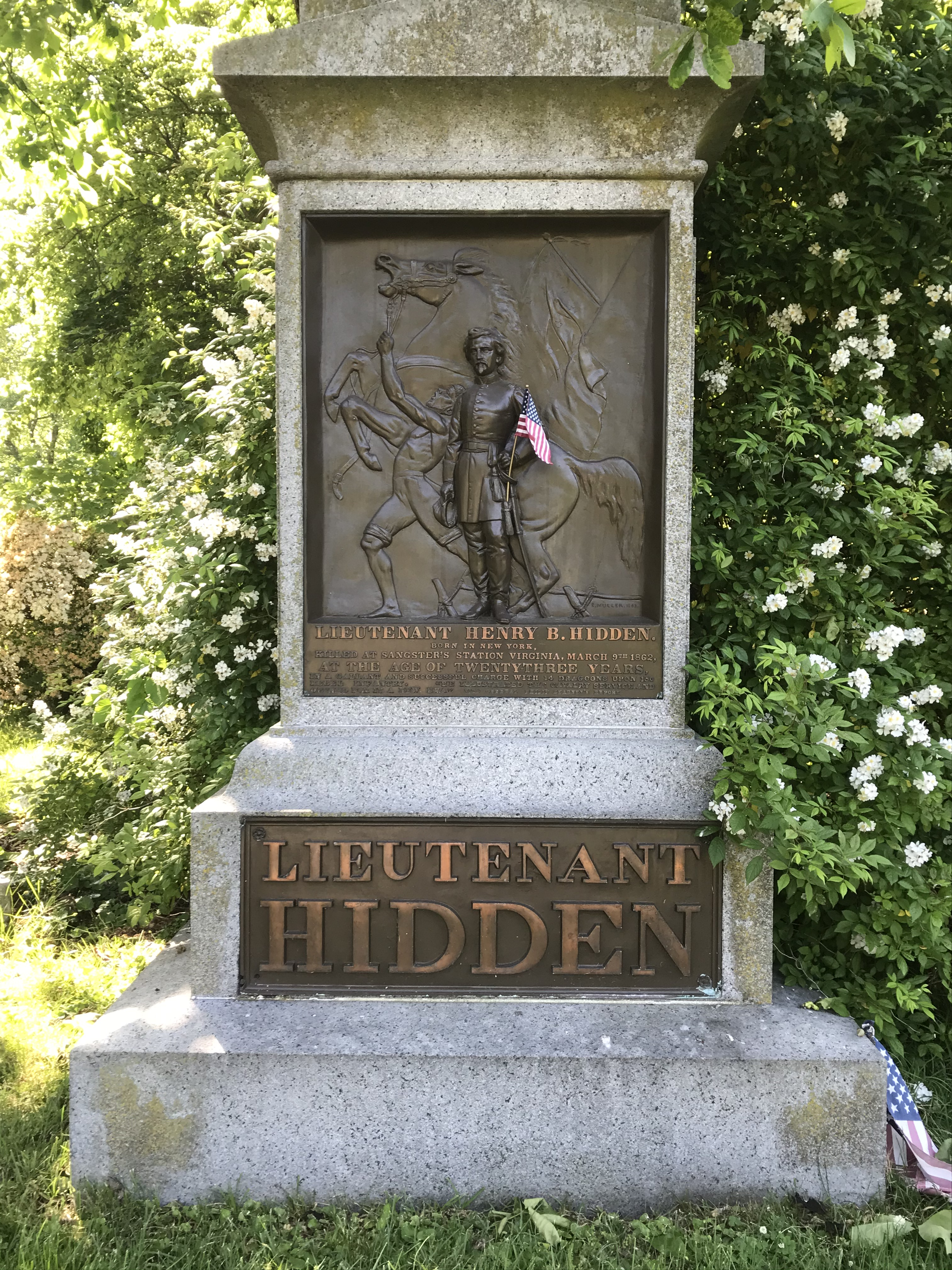
Memorial in Green-Wood Cemetery

Hidden was buried in Green-Wood Cemetery in Brooklyn, New York.

== Artistic depictions of Hidden's charge ==
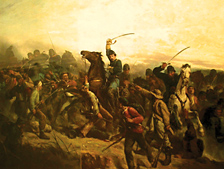
Hidden as depicted by Victor Nehlig

Hidden's charge sparked the imagination of several artists in subsequent years. Victor Nehlig painted An Episode of the War — The Cavalry Charge of Lt. Henry B. Hidden in 1875, and Frank Leslie illustrated the Sangster's Station skirmish in The Soldier of Our Civil War (1893). The former is on display in the New-York Historical Society's Henry Luce III Center for the Study of American Culture.

Additionally, the New York Evening Post printed a poem inspired by his charge.

== See also ==
- Elmer E. Ellsworth
