= 16th Virginia Cavalry Regiment =

- Flag of Virginia, 1861
- Active: 1863—1865
- Disbanded: April 9th, 1865
- Country: Confederacy
- Allegiance: Confederate States of America
- Branch: Confederate States Army
- Type: Cavalry
- Engagements: American Civil War: Battle of Gettysburg; Battle of Droop Mountain; Action at Nineveh

The 16th Virginia Cavalry Regiment was created in early 1863 when Milton Ferguson's Battalion of Cavalry was combined with Otis Caldwell's Battalion of Cavalry in Salem, Virginia. Milton Ferguson was elected colonel of the regiment. The men were primarily recruited from the West Virginia counties of Wayne, Putnam, Cabell, Kanawha and the Virginia counties of Russell, Tazewell, and Roanoke.

It was present at Gettysburg and was part of General Jenkins' Brigade that itself was part of General Jeb Stuart's Cavalry Division of the Confederate Army of Northern Virginia. The 16th Virginia Cavalry is considered the Confederate unit that caused the first Union casualty on Union soil - Corporal William Rihl.

Following the Confederate army's return to Virginia after Gettysburg, the 16th Virginia Cavalry moved into West Virginia and participated in the Battle of Droop Mountain.

The 16th Virginia Cavalry suffered its biggest defeat in the Battle of Murder Hollow in Wayne County, West Virginia, which happened to be the county where Ferguson's Battalion originated. Fifty men of the regiment along with Colonel Ferguson were camped in the hollow and were attacked by more than four hundred Federal troops under Colonel George Gallup of Louisa, Kentucky. Thirty-eight men of the 16th were captured and five were killed. An additional eleven died in prison. William Graham served as colonel of the regiment until Ferguson was exchanged later that year.

The regiment disbanded at Lynchburg after Lee surrendered at Appomattox.

== See also ==
- List of Virginia Civil War units
- List of West Virginia Civil War Confederate units
