= William O. Moore =

American politician (1841–1914)

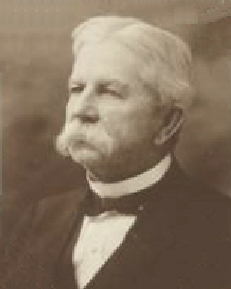

Member of the Virginia House of Delegates from Wythe County
- In office January 10, 1912 – October 3, 1913
- Preceded by: Harry G. Robinson
- Succeeded by: John H. Crockett

Personal details
- Born: William Orville Moore; February 17, 1841 Wythe County, Virginia, U.S.
- Died: October 3, 1913 (aged 72) Wytheville, Virginia, U.S.
- Party: Democratic
- Spouse(s): Adeline Pearson Jones; Page Taylor

Military service
- Allegiance: Confederate States
- Branch/service: Confederate States Army
- Years of service: 1861–1865
- Rank: Colonel
- Unit: 22nd Virginia Cavalry
- Battles/wars: American Civil War

William Orville Moore (February 17, 1841 – October 3, 1913) was an American Democratic politician who served as a member of the Virginia House of Delegates, representing his native Wythe County for one session until his death in 1913.

Moore enlisted in the Confederate Army in 1861 and was commissioned as a lieutenant in the 22nd Virginia Cavalry. He served until the end of the war, being promoted up to colonel just before the fall of Richmond.

Virginia House of Delegates
| Preceded by Harry G. Robinson | Virginia Delegate for Wythe County; 1912–1913 | Succeeded by John H. Crockett |
