= William Badger Tibbits =

Union Army officer

William B. Tibbits
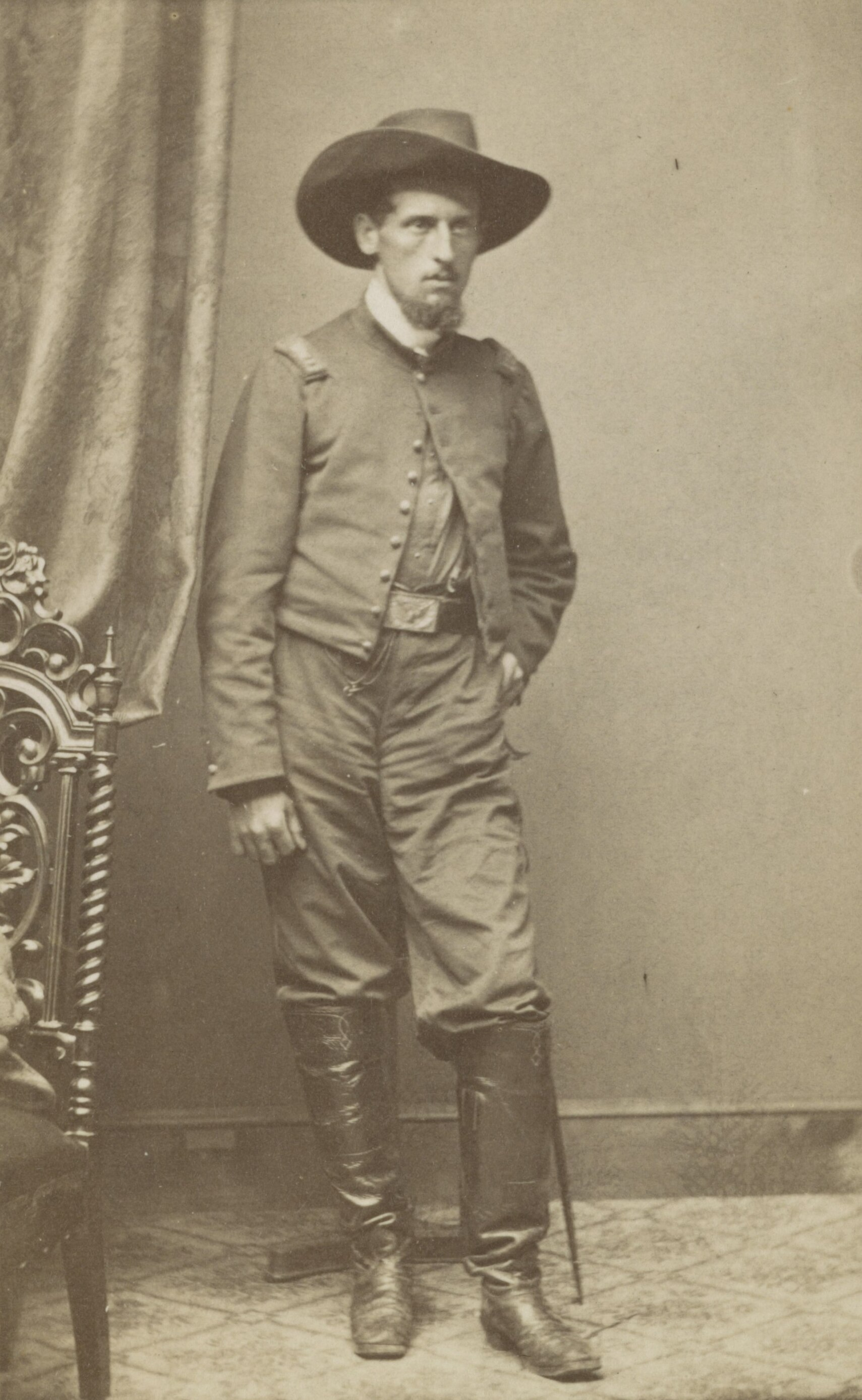
- Tibbits in uniform with sword
- Born: William Badger Tibbits; March 31, 1837; Hoosick, New York, US
- Died: February 10, 1880 (aged 43); Troy, New York, US
- Burial place: Oakwood Cemetery
- Military career
- Allegiance: Union
- Branch: Union Army
- Service years: 1861–1866
- Rank: Brigadier-general; Bvt. Major-general (U.S.V.)
- Battles: American Civil War; Battle of Big Bethel; The Peninsula Campaign; Seven Days Battles; Second Battle of Bull Run; Battle of Fredericksburg; Battle of Chancellorsville; Battle of New Market; Battle of Piedmont; Battle of Lynchburg

William Badger Tibbits (March 31, 1837 – February 10, 1880) was an officer in the Union Army during the American Civil War. He raised a company of infantry in the 2nd New York Infantry, and led it as captain, and later major, till 1863, when he was authorized to raise and lead a regiment of cavalry, the 21st New York Cavalry, and was promoted to colonel. On January 13, 1866, President Andrew Johnson nominated Tibbits for appointment to the grade of brigadier general of volunteers, to rank from October 18, 1865, and the United States Senate confirmed the appointment on February 23, 1866. On May 4, 1866, President Johnson nominated Tibbits for appointment to the grade of brevet major general of volunteers to rank from March 13, 1865, and the United States Senate confirmed the appointment on May 16, 1866.

== Life ==
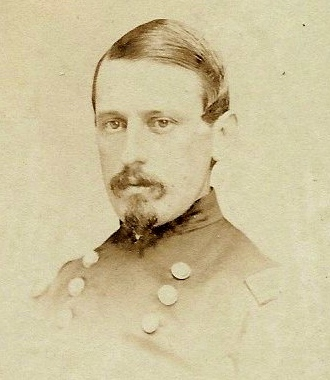
William B. Tibbits, c. 1865–1866

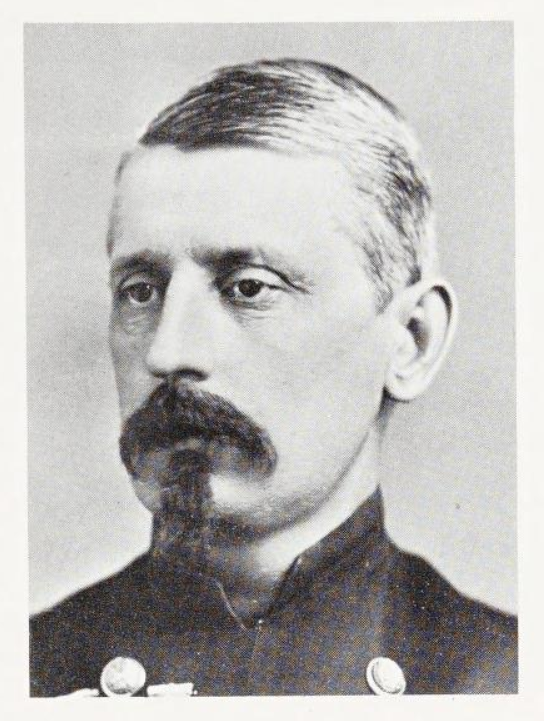
William B. Tibbits, date unknown

William Badger Tibbits, the youngest son of George Mortimer Tibbits, was born at Hoosick, in Rensselaer County, New York, on March 31, 1837. His early youth was passed partly in Troy and partly in the country, and after having received elementary instruction at various schools, he graduated from Union college in 1859. He was engaged in business at Troy when, on the morning of April 15, 1861, news of the Rebellion starting in the South reached his ears. Heeding the Federal appeal, he at once left his office and obtained papers authorizing him to raise a company in a regiment which it was that day decided should be formed in Troy. He never returned to the business which he had abandoned, and in consequence of this abandonment the business proved to him a total loss.

His efforts as a soldier, from this point forward, were unwearied. He recruited more men for his company than any other person connected with it, and it was accepted, on April 23, 1861, as a part of the 2nd Regiment New York State Volunteers, with the following officers: Captain, William B. Tibbits; 1st Lieutenant, James Savage; 2nd Lieutenant, William Sullivan. The company was known as G company, and Tibbits was mustered into the service as captain on May 14, 1861. An idea of the nature of his services during the next seventeen months may be gained from the following recommendation:

Headquarters Carr's Brig., Sickles' Div.
Camp at Fairfax Seminary, Va., Oct. 18, 1862.

General, — I have the honor to recommend the promotion of Captain William B. Tibbits, Second New York State Volunteers, to be major vice George W.Wilson, resigned. Captain Tibbits is the senior, and one of only two original captains left with the regiment. He has been with it on every picket, march, and reconnoissance, and in every skirmish and battle, at Big Bethel, Fair Oaks, Glendale, Malvern Hill, Bristow, and Bull Run. At Bristow he particularly distinguished himself, and was honorably mentioned for gallant and meritorious conduct at Bull Run. His vast experience, undaunted courage, and excellent judgment well qualify him for the position for which I have had the honor to recommend him. I have the honor to be,

Your most obedient servant,
Joseph B. Carr, Brig.-Gen., U. S. V.

To Brig.-Gen. Thomas Hillhouse,
State of New York, Albany, N. Y.

This recommendation was duly honored by the State of New York, and Captain Tibbits was appointed major of the regiment, his commission bearing date October 13, 1862. The term of the 2nd Regiment expired in the following year, and on May 23, 1863, Major Tibbits was mustered out with the regiment, at the city of Troy. On June 17, 1863, he procured authorization papers to raise a cavalry regiment, to be known as the Griswold Light Cavalry, to serve for three years unless sooner discharged. The regiment received its name from the Hon. John A. Griswold, then the representative in Congress from the district embracing the city of Troy. About the time that the completion of the regiment was assured, a number of Major Tibbits' personal friends testified their appreciation of his bravery and merit by the gift of a sword, which bore the following inscriptions:

Col. Wm. B. Tibbits — from a few of his friends, as a token both of their personal regard and of their admiration of his gallantry. Troy, N. Y., Nov. 18, 1863.

New Market Bridge, Big Bethel, Fair Oaks, Glendale, Malvern Hill, Bristow, Second Bull Run, Fredericksburg, Chancellorsville.

On January 1, 1864, Major Tibbits was mustered in as colonel of the 21st New York (Griswold Light) Cavalry, with rank as colonel from November 20, 1863. The first engagement in which the regiment took part was at New Market, Virginia, on Sunday, May 15, 1864. His services, performed early in the succeeding June, were acknowledged as follows:

Baltimore, Md., August 29, 1864.

Colonel, — I regret exceedingly that the suddenness with which I left my command at Staunton, Va., on account of my wound, prevented me from issuing the order which I had intended to, and which you so justly deserved, commending you for your gallant conduct at the battle of Piedmont, June 5, 1864, and on which day it was my pleasure to thank you and your gallant regiment (on the battlefield) for the brilliant success they had achieved. The faithful and efficient manner in which you discharged your every duty while under my command has won for you my highest esteem and best wishes for your every undertaking; and as merit for the criterion for promotion in our army, I feel confident that the promotion for brigadier-general will be reward for your gallant services.

Very sincerely and truly, Your friend,
Stahl, Maj. Gen.

To Col. William B. Tibbits, 21st New York Cavalry.

For the two months following the battle of Piedmont his command was constantly employed. Labors performed and dangers undergone were recognised by his superiors. That such recognition was not lacking appears by the following communication:

Headquarters 1st Cavalry Division, Dep't of West Virginia.
Hancock, Md., Aug. 5, 1864.

Maj.-Gen. David Hunter, Commanding Department of West Virginia, Monocacy Junction, Md.

Sir, — I have the honor to recommend for gallantry in action, and efficiency under all circumstances in the field, Col. William B. Tibbits, 21st NY Vol. Cavalry, now commanding the first brigade of this (1st Cavalry) Division. This officer has served under my command since the 10th of June, 1864, and I have found him, on all occasions, a competent, faithful and gallant officer. He has, on several occasions, distinguished himself in action. His meritorious conduct has commanded the admiration of myself and his command. I would respectfully recommend him as worthy of promotion to the rank of Brigadier General U. S. Volunteers. I would respectfully call your attention to especial mention made of this officer in my official report of July 27, 1864. This reporl has been forwarded to the head-quarters of Brevet Major-General Crook, commanding forces in the field, Department of West Virginia.

I am, General, very respectfully, Your obedient servant,
A. N. Duffie, Brig.-Gen.

On the receipt of this communication it was indorsed in these terms:

Headquarters Department West Virginia.
Harper's Ferry, Va., Aug. 7. 1804.

Respectfully forwarded to the Adjutant-General of the army, approved, and earnestly recommended. See enclosed copy of General Orders, No. 63, current series, from these headquarters.

D. Hunter, Major-General Commanding.

The general order referred to was as follows:

Headquarters Department of West Virginia.
Harper's Ferry, Aug. 7, 1864.

General Order No. 63.

Colonel William B. Tibbits, 21st New York Cavalry, commanding 1st Brigade, 1st Cavalry Division, having been highly complimented by his division commander for gallantry in action and efficiency under all circumstances in the field, and having been recommended as a competent, faithful, and valiant officer, worthy of promotion to the rank of Brigadier-General United States Volunteers, the Major-General commanding takes pleasure in commending to the command the conduct of Colonel Tibbits, and in approving the recommendation for his promotion.

By order of
Maj.-Gen. Hunter.
P. G. Bier, A. A. General.

Official 1st Division: E. W. Clark, A. A. G.

This recognition of the conduct of Colonel Tibbits was made still more complimentary by being read on dress-parade to each command in Hunter's army. On October 21, 1864, the regiment received from the Hon. John A. Griswold a stand of colors, the regulation-flag and the regimental standard, both being of heavy silk, and bearing appropriate devices and embellishments embroidered upon them.

In the 1880 book, History of Rensselaer Co., New York, author Nathaniel Bartlett Sylvester wrote that on November 17, 1864, Colonel Tibbits received an official communication from the War Department, conferring on him the designation of brevet brigadier-general, with rank from October 21, 1864. Historian Ezra Warner accepts this date but cites no source. His reference to the Official Records only shows the August 7, 1864 letter from Major General David Hunter recommending the promotion, the same information cited by Sylvester. Historians John H. and David J. Eicher show that on December 12, 1864 Tibbits was nominated by President Abraham Lincoln for appointment to the grade of brevet brigadier general of volunteers, to rank from October 21, 1864 and that the United States Senate confirmed the appointment on February 14, 1865. However, the Eichers note that the commission was not issued, citing Hunt, Roger D. and Jack R. Brown, Brevet Brigadier Generals in Blue.. Hunt and Brown have no entry for Tibbits as a brevet brigadier general.

Not only did Tibbits services extend through the war, but after its conclusion he was ordered west, on the plains, and it was not until in September, 1865, that he received permission, while at Leavenworth, Kansas, to return to his home at Troy, and there await orders.

On January 13, 1866, President Andrew Johnson nominated Tibbits for appointment to the grade of brigadier general of volunteers, to rank from October 18, 1865, and the United States Senate confirmed the appointment on February 23, 1866. Tibbits was mustered out of the volunteers on January 15, 1866. On May 4, 1866, President Johnson nominated Tibbits for appointment to the grade of brevet major general of volunteers to rank from March 13, 1865, and the United States Senate confirmed the appointment on May 16, 1866. (Note: As Hunt and Brown state at p. xiii: "Although several exceptions were made...[citing two]...virtually all of the brevet commissions after May 1865 bore the date March 13, 1865 or the date of the letter of appointment.")

Colonel Tibbits was engaged in battles or actions in Virginia at: New Market, Piedmont, Lynchburg, Hillsboro, Snicker's Gap, Ashby's Gap, Kearnestown, Winchester, Martinsburg, Charlestown, Halltown, Nineveh, Rood's Hill, and Liberty Mill or Gordonsville.

Troy, New York, 1877

General Tibbits returned to Troy in 1866, where for several years afterwards he suffered greatly, resulting from injuries received while in the service. He died at his home in Troy on February 10, 1880, and was buried in Oakwood Cemetery.

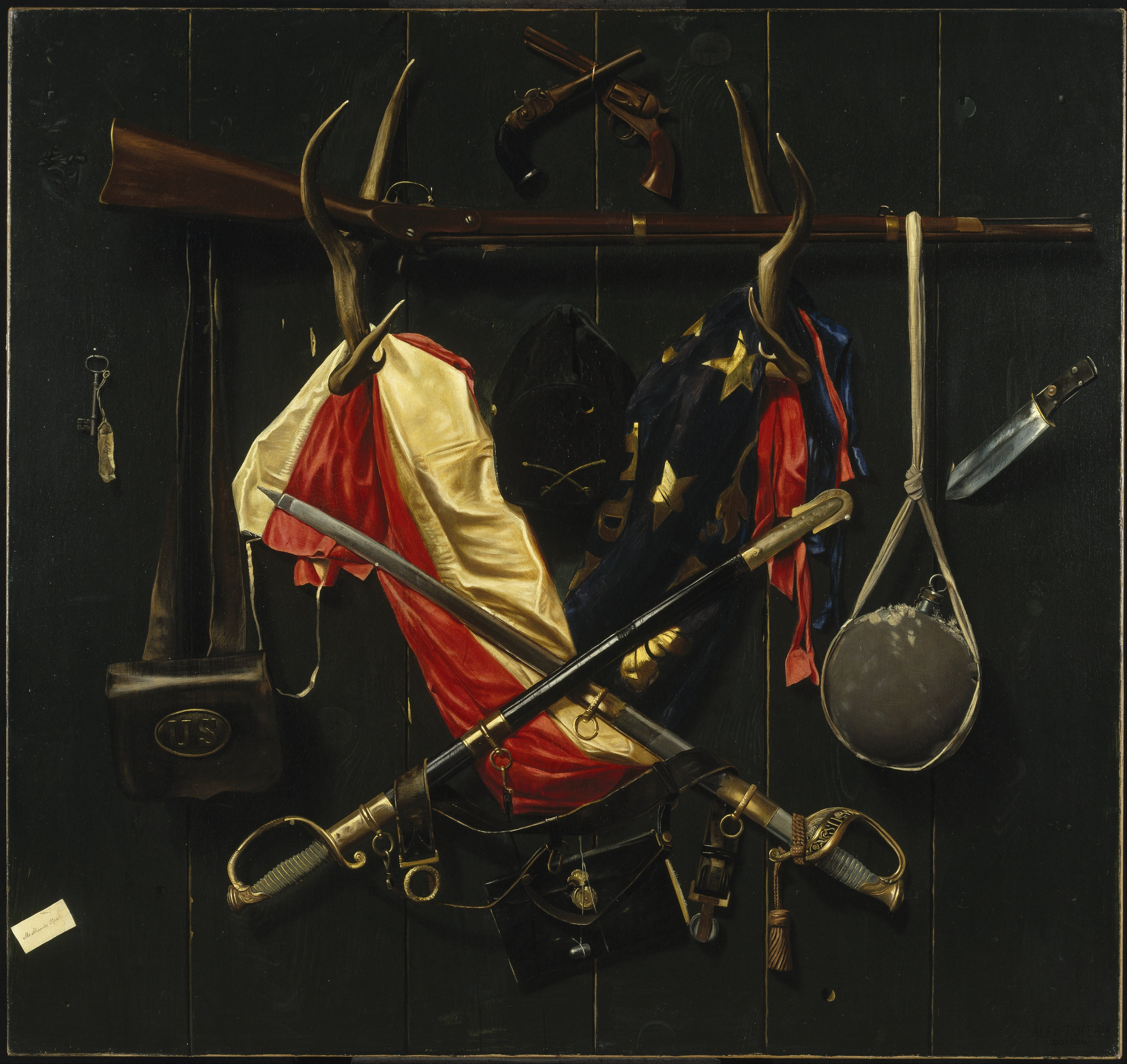
Alexander Pope's Emblems of the Civil War, 1888, depicts the military mementos of Tibbits.

The will, admitted to probate on March 24, bequeathed $100,000 for the erection and maintenance of a home for indigent soldiers of the armies of the United States of the Civil War, and for indigent old men and women, who might be admitted if the house was not filled with soldiers. The gift was conditional upon the raising of $50,000 additional within five years, and the erection of the home, to be known as Tibbits Home, in or near Tibbets Avenue, in the city of Troy. The will also left $500 annually for five years to the Tibbits Veteran Corps, and the same amount to the Tibbits Cadets, and at the expiration of five years each company was set to receive $8,333.34. The Tibbits estate, left to four heirs, of whom General Tibbits was one, was the largest landed estate in the city, and had never been divided. It was estimated to amount to upward of $1,000,000.

Nathaniel Bartlett Sylvester, writing in 1880, makes the following appraisal of Tibbits: "a man whose sound judgment when advice was needed, whose bravery when fighting was to be done, and whose celerity in movement when action was required, won for him, in the stations which he filled, the reputation of being a skillful soldier, and, at the same time, one of the most intrepid spirits of the war."

== Sources ==
- Eicher, John H., and David J. Eicher, Civil War High Commands. Stanford: Stanford University Press, 2001. ISBN 978-0-8047-3641-1.
- Hoopes, Donelson F. (1966). "Alexander Pope, Painter of "Characteristic Pieces"". The Brooklyn Museum Annual, 8. pp. 129–146.
- Hunt, Roger D. and Jack R. Brown, Brevet Brigadier Generals in Blue. Gaithersburg, MD: Olde Soldier Books, Inc., 1990. ISBN 978-1-56013-002-4.
- Sylvester, Nathaniel Bartlett (1880). History of Rensselaer Co., New York. Philadelphia: Everts & Peck. pp. 89, 192ɢ–192ʜ.
- Warner, Ezra J. (1964). "William Badger Tibbits". Generals in Blue: Lives of the Union Commanders. Baton Rouge: Louisiana State University Press. pp. 505–506.
- Wilson, James Grant; Fiske, John, eds. (1889). "Tibbits, George". Appleton's Cyclopædia of American Biography. Vol. 6. New York: D. Appleton and Company. p. 110, col. 2.
- "Emblems of the Civil War". Brooklyn Museum. Retrieved March 12, 2023.
- "Founding a Soldiers' Home / The Bequests of the Late Gen. W. B. Tibbets". The New York Times. March 25, 1880. p. 1, col. 4.
