= Levi Shoemaker =

- Born: June 25, 1840; Monongalia, Virginia, US (modern-day West Virginia)
- Died: April 3, 1917 (aged 76); Monongalia, West Virginia, US
- Military career
- Allegiance: United States of America; Union
- Branch: United States Army; Union Army
- Rank: Sergeant
- Units: Company A, 1st West Virginia Volunteer Cavalry Regiment
- Conflicts: American Civil War
- Awards: Medal of Honor

Levi Shoemaker (June 25, 1840 – April 3, 1917) was a Union Army soldier during the American Civil War who received the U.S. military's highest decoration, the Medal of Honor.

== Military service ==
Shoemaker volunteered for service in the Union Army and was assigned as a sergeant to Company A of the 1st West Virginia Volunteer Cavalry Regiment. He received the Medal of Honor for capturing the flag of the 22nd Virginia Cavalry in battle at Nineveh, Virginia, on November 12, 1864. Another 1st West Virginia Cavalry soldier, Private James F. Adams, also received the medal for capturing a Confederate flag during the skirmish.

== Medal of Honor citation ==
For The President of the United States of America, in the name of Congress, takes pleasure in presenting the Medal of Honor to Sergeant Levi Shoemaker, United States Army, for extraordinary heroism on 12 November 1864, while serving with Company A, 1st West Virginia Cavalry, in action at Nineveh, Virginia, for capture of flag of 22d Virginia Cavalry (Confederate States of America).

General Orders: Date of Issue: November 26, 1864

Action Date: November 12, 1864

Service: Army

Rank: Sergeant

Company: Company A

Division: 1st West Virginia Cavalry

== See also ==
- List of American Civil War Medal of Honor recipients: Q–S
