= 22nd Virginia Cavalry Regiment =

- Flag of Virginia, 1861
- Active: October 1863 – April 1865
- Disbanded: April 1865
- Country: Confederacy
- Allegiance: Confederate States of America
- Branch: Confederate States Army
- Type: Cavalry
- Engagements: Valley Campaigns of 1864; Battle of Five Forks

The 22nd Virginia Cavalry Regiment was a cavalry regiment raised in Virginia for service in the Confederate States Army during the American Civil War. It fought mostly in southwestern Virginia, East Tennessee, and the Shenandoah Valley.

Virginia's 22nd Cavalry Regiment completed its organization in October, 1863, and was sometimes called "Bowen's Regiment Virginia Mounted Riflemen," having been raised by Col. Henry S. Bowen, formerly of the 188th (Tazewell County Militia. The unit served in William Lowther Jackson's and John McCausland's Brigade and confronted the Federals in Tennessee, western Virginia (including newly created West Virginia), and the Shenandoah Valley. During April, 1865, it disbanded. The field officers were Colonel Henry S. Bowen, Lieutenant Colonel John T. Radford, and Major Henry F. Kendrick. A Union soldier, Sergeant Levi Shoemaker, was awarded the Medal of Honor for capturing the regiment's flag during the Action at Nineveh in Warren County, Virginia, on November 12, 1864. Two members would later serve one term each in the Virginia General Assembly, John C. Stanfield who would also serve as superintendent of the Washington Alms House before returning to Washington County and serving in the House of Delegates in 1906, and William Orville Moore representing Wythe County in 1912.

== Companies and officers ==
Sortable table
Company	Nickname	Recruited at	First (then later) Commanding Officer
A	Captain Fuller's Company	Tazewell County	Hiram F. Kendrick; Abram Fuller
B	Company B	Tazewell County	Gordon W. Riffe
C	Company C	Washington County	John C. Stanfield
D	Company D	Russell County	Martin Ball
E	Company E	Washington CountyRussell County	William M. Baldwin; Reese M. Baldwin
F	Company F	Tazewell County	William Washington Brown
G	Company G	Wythe County; Carroll County	William O. Moore
H	Company H	Tazewell County	Balaam W. Higginbotham
I	Company I	Russell County; Tazewell County	William P. Samples

== See also ==
- List of Virginia Civil War units
