= Nineveh, Virginia =

Unincorporated community in Virginia, US

Nineveh is an unincorporated community in Warren County, Virginia, United States, on the main road (U.S. Route 522) between Winchester and Front Royal. Prior to the creation of Warren County in 1836, Nineveh was part of Frederick County. A post office at Nineveh operated from the early 1800s until closing in 1954.

== Geography ==
Nineveh is located in the Shenandoah Valley at 39°00′57″N 078°09′54″W at an elevation of 538 feet. It is situated along Crooked Run, a Shenandoah River tributary.

== History ==
Quakers who arrived in the 1730s were among the earliest European settlers in the vicinity of Nineveh. The Crooked Run Quaker meeting house was built near Nineveh before 1760, and Quaker worship continued there until 1810. Baptists also settled around Nineveh in the 1700s, and built the Zion Baptist Church, the oldest known church building in Warren County. A Presbyterian congregation worshipped at the Zion Baptist Church before acquiring the site of the Crooked Run Quaker meeting house, and establishing the Nineveh Presbyterian Church (which now uses a Front Royal, Virginia, mailing address).

In the American Civil War Valley Campaigns of 1864, there was a skirmish on 12 November 1864 at Nineveh. Union Army soldiers Private James F. Adams and Sergeant Levi Shoemaker, both of the 1st Regiment, West Virginia Volunteer Cavalry, were awarded the Medal of Honor for capturing flags from two Confederate cavalry regiments in this skirmish. Confederate Lieutenant General Thomas Jonathan "Stonewall" Jackson in November 1862 was encamped at Nineveh.
