= 1st New York Cavalry Regiment =

Unit of the Union Army in the American Civil War

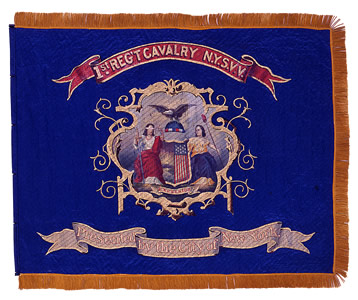
- Regimental banner of 1 NY Cav
- Active: September 1861 to June 1865
- Country: United States
- Allegiance: Union
- Branch: Cavalry
- Engagements: American Civil War 1862: Siege of Yorktown, Glendale, Malvern Hill, Antietam; 1863: Second Winchester, Williamsport; 1864: New Market, Lynchburg, Kernstown II, Moorefield det. of 386, Third Winchester, Fisher's Hill, Cedar Creek, Action at Nineveh 1865: Waynesboro, Dinwiddie Court House, Five Forks, Namozine Church, Sailor's Creek, Appomattox Station, Appomattox Court House

Commanders
- Colonel: Andrew T. McReynolds
- Colonel: Alonzo Adams
- Lt. Colonel: Jenyns B. Battersby

The 1st New York Cavalry Regiment was a regiment in the Union Army in the American Civil War. It was also known as the Lincoln Cavalry, Carbine Rangers, Sabre Regiment, and 1st United States Volunteer Cavalry.

== Service ==
It was mustered in from July 16 to August 31, 1861.

It was mustered out June 27, 1865.

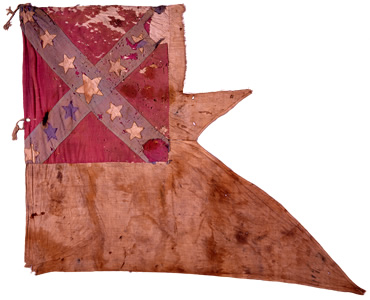
A Confederate flag captured by the regiment August 7, 1864 Moorefield West Virginia

== Casualties ==
The regiment sustained 25 officers and men killed in action, 134 wounded, of whom 23 died and 111 recovered, 384 missing in action, and 120 died of disease and other causes, for a total of 168 casualties. Among its losses were 1st Lieut. Henry B. Hidden, killed March 9, 1862, one of the first Union cavalry officers killed in the Civil War, and Corporal William H. Rihl, the first soldier killed in combat north of the Mason–Dixon line, on June 22, 1863.

== Gallery ==
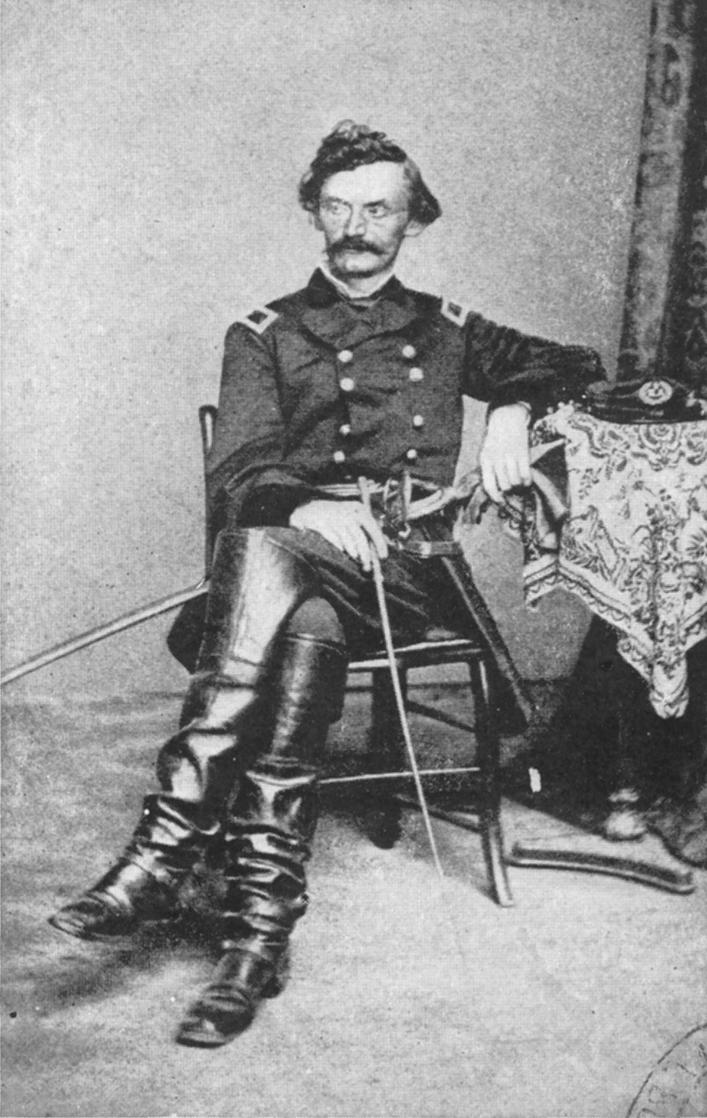
Carl Schultz

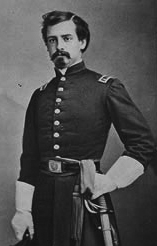
Henry B Hidden

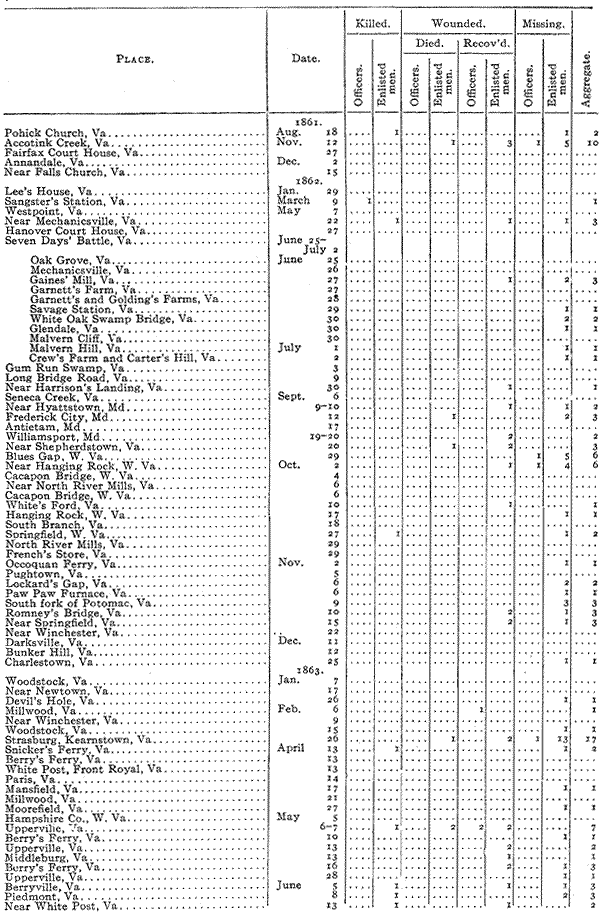
A list of the regiment's battles and casualties

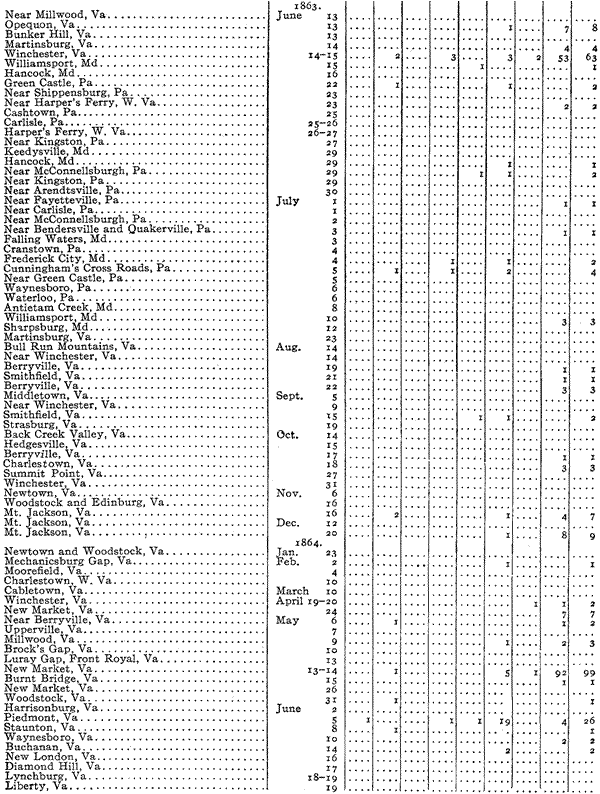
The regiment's list of battles and casualties, cont. (Page 2)

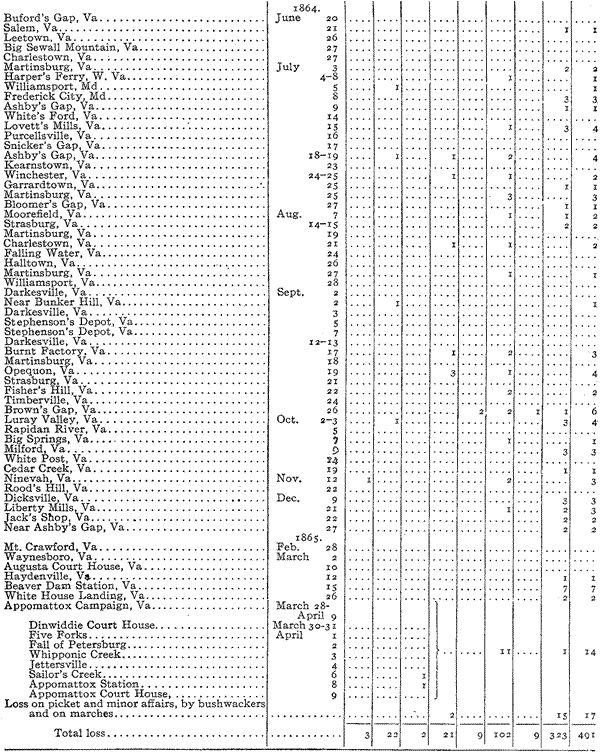
The regiment's list of battles and casualties, page 3.

== See also ==
- List of New York Civil War units
