= Samuel T. Crockett =

American politician

Member of the Virginia Senate from the 19th district
- In office January 13, 1926 – January 11, 1928
- Preceded by: John H. Crockett
- Succeeded by: Anderson E. Shumate

Personal details
- Born: Samuel Thorn Crockett; November 28, 1890 Wytheville, Virginia, U.S.
- Died: February 4, 1946 (aged 55) Charlottesville, Virginia, U.S.
- Party: Democratic
- Spouse: Agnes Oglesby Simmerman
- Parent: John H. Crockett (father)

Samuel Thorn Crockett (November 28, 1890 – February 4, 1946) was an American Democratic politician who served as a member of the Virginia Senate from 1926 to 1928.

The son of John H. Crockett (1864–1925) and his first wife, the former Emma Thorn (1866–1895), he succeeded his father after his death in office.

Senate of Virginia
Preceded by John H. Crockett	Virginia Senator for the 19th District; 1926–1928	Succeeded by Anderson E. Shumate
