= John H. Crockett =

American politician

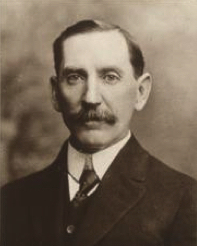

Member of the Virginia Senate
- In office January 11, 1922 – January 19, 1925
- Preceded by: E. Lee Trinkle
- Succeeded by: Samuel T. Crockett
- Constituency: 5th district (1922‍–‍1924); 19th district (1924‍–‍1925)

Member of the Virginia House of Delegates from Wythe County
- In office January 14, 1914 – January 11, 1922
- Preceded by: William O. Moore
- Succeeded by: John T. Graham

Personal details
- Born: John Henry Crockett; January 5, 1864 Wythe County, Virginia, U.S.
- Died: January 19, 1925 (aged 61) Roanoke, Virginia, U.S.
- Party: Democratic
- Spouses: Emma Thorn (m. 1888; died 1895); Louisa Ewing Painter (m. 1901; died 1905); Rachael Cecil Crockett (m. 1920)
- Children: 6, including Samuel

John Henry Crockett (January 5, 1864 – January 19, 1925) was an American Democratic politician who served as a member of the Virginia House of Delegates and Virginia Senate from 1914 until his death in 1925. The rest of his term was completed by his son, Samuel.

Virginia House of Delegates
Preceded by William O. Moore	Virginia Delegate for Wythe County; 1914–1922	Succeeded by John T. Graham
Senate of Virginia
Preceded by E. Lee Trinkle	Virginia Senator for the 5th District; 1922–1924	Succeeded by Cecil C. Vaughan, Jr.
Preceded by J. Belmont Woodson	Virginia Senator for the 19th District; 1924–1925	Succeeded by Samuel T. Crockett
