= Pliny A. Crockett =

American politician

Pliny A. Crockett (November 16, 1873 – March 8, 1958) was an American banker and politician from Maine. Crockett, a Republican from Hollis, York County, served two terms in the Maine House of Representatives (1925-1928) and two in the Maine Senate (1929-1932). He was a prominent elected official in Hollis, including four years on the Board of Selectmen, six years as Superintendent of Schools and six years on the School Committee. During his four years in the Maine House, he served on the Education Committee, including a term as house chair in 1927–28. He also served as chair of the Library Committee and on the Banking Committee.

Crockett studied at local public schools in the Hollis area as well as Nichols Latin School in Lewiston. He then taught school for two years and then farmed and worked as an agent for the New England Mutual Life Insurance Company as well. In 1920, he became the treasurer for the Buxton and Hollis Savings Bank. When that bank was acquired by the Casco Mercantile Trust Company, Crockett remained branch manager and assistant treasurer.

Crockett was a deacon in the Baptist Church and married Lucy M. Smith in 1900. They had one child, a daughter, Pauline.
