= List of Medal of Honor recipients from the 1st West Virginia Cavalry Regiment =

This List of Medal of Honor recipients from the 1st West Virginia Volunteer Cavalry Regiment is sortable by recipient, rank, company, place, date, and reason for the award. The 1st West Virginia Volunteer Cavalry Regiment served in the Union Army during the American Civil War.

== Background ==
The First Virginia Cavalry, not to be confused with the Confederate 1st Virginia Cavalry, and later renamed the 1st West Virginia Cavalry Regiment, was formed during the summer and fall of 1861 to fight for the Union in the American Civil War. Although it started slowly, it became one of the most effective of all West Virginia regiments. The regiment had more Medal of Honor recipients than any other West Virginia regiment. The majority of its fighting took place in Virginia and what is now West Virginia, although the regiment also fought in Maryland and Pennsylvania (including the Battle of Gettysburg). The regiment participated in most of Sheridan's Shenandoah Valley Campaign, and was present at Robert E. Lee's surrender of the Army of Northern Virginia at Appomattox. The regiment mustered out July 8, 1865. It lost 10 officers and 71 enlisted men killed or mortally wounded, and 126 enlisted men died from disease.

Name	Rank	Co.	Place of action	Date of action	Action
James F. Adams	Private	D	Nineveh, Virginia	November 12, 1864	Flag capture
Thomas Anderson	Corporal	I	Appomattox Station, Virginia	April 8, 1865	Flag capture (Note: The Lee Chapel and Museum of Washington and Lee University has, at times, displayed the Confederate flag captured by Corporal Thomas Anderson. The museum identifies the flag as Battle Flag no. 356)
Wilmon W. Blackmar	First Lieutenant	H	Five Forks, Virginia	April 1, 1865	Leadership
Hugh P. Boon	Captain	B	Sayler's Creek, Virginia	April 6, 1865	Flag capture
Richard Boury	Sergeant	C	Charlottesville, Virginia	March 5, 1865	Flag capture
Charles E. Capehart	Major	—	Monterey Pass, Virginia	July 4, 1863	Leadership
Henry Capehart	Colonel	—	Greenbrier River, West Virginia	May 22, 1864	Rescue
Francis M. Cunningham	First Sergeant	H	Sayler's Creek, Virginia	April 6, 1865	Flag capture
William Houlton	Commissary Sergeant	—	Sayler's Creek, Virginia	April 6, 1865	Flag capture
Archibald H. Rowand, Jr.	Private	K	Virginia	March 1865	Carrying dispatches
Charles Schorn	Chief Bugler	M	Appomattox Station, Virginia	April 8, 1865	Flag capture
Emisire Shahan	Corporal	A	Sayler's Creek, Virginia	April 6, 1865	Flag capture
Levi Shoemaker	Sergeant	A	Nineveh, Virginia	November 12, 1864	Flag capture
Daniel A. Woods	Private	K	Sayler's Creek, Virginia	April 6, 1865	Flag capture

== Notes ==
Footnotes

Citations

References

- Beyer, Walter F.; Keydel, Oscar F. (1907). Deeds of Valor : from Records in the Archives of the United States Government; How American Heroes Won the Medal of Honor; History of our Recent Wars and Explorations, from Personal Reminiscences and Records of Officers and Enlisted Men who were Rewarded by Congress for Most Conspicuous Acts of Bravery on the Battle-field, on the High Seas and in Arctic Explorations Volume I. Detroit: Perrien-Keydel Co. OCLC 3898179.
- Speicher, James (2009). Sumter Flying Artillery : A Civil War History of the Eleventh Battalion Georgia Light Artillery. Gretna, Louisiana: Pelican Publishing Co. ISBN 978-1-45561-267-3. OCLC 922577268.
- Wallace, Lew (1897). The Story of American heroism : Thrilling Narratives of Personal Adventures During the Great Civil War, as Told by the Medal Winners and Roll of Honor Men. Springfield, Ohio: J. W. Jones. OCLC 11816985.
- Wittenberg, Eric J.; Petruzzi, J. David; Nugent, Michael F. (2008). One Continuous Fight: the Retreat from Gettysburg and the Pursuit of Lee's Army of Northern Virginia, July 4–14, 1863. New York: Savas Beatie. ISBN 978-1-9327144-3-2. OCLC 185031178.
