= Emisire Shahan =

Sergeant Emisire Shahan
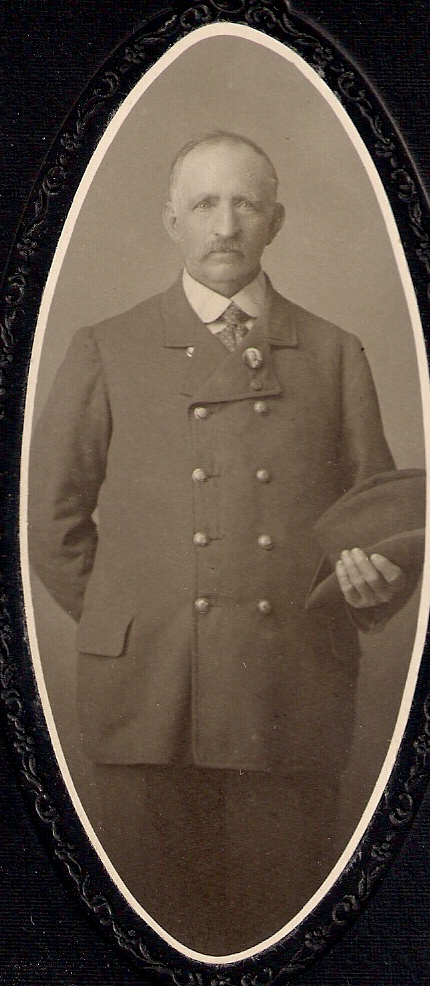
- Born: Amaziah Shahan; 14 August 1843; Preston County, West Virginia
- Died: 17 November 1919 (aged 76); Satsop, Washington
- Burial place: Masonic Cemetery, Elma, Washington
- Military career
- Allegiance: United States (Union)
- Branch: Army
- Service years: 1861-unknown
- Rank: Sergeant
- Units: Company A, 1st West Virginia Cavalry
- Conflicts: Battle of Sailor's Creek, Virginia
- Awards: Medal of Honor

Emisire Shahan (14 August 1843 - 17 November 1919, also known as Amaziah Shahan) was a sergeant in the United States Army who was awarded the Medal of Honor for gallantry during the American Civil War. Shahan was awarded the medal on 3 May 1865 for actions performed at the Battle of Sailor's Creek in Virginia on 6 April 1865.

== Personal life ==
Shahan was born on 14 August 1843 in Preston County, West Virginia to parents Samuel Shahan and Rebecca Wolfe. He was one of 3 siblings and 3 half-siblings fathered by Samuel Shahan. He married Rebecca Miller (1846-1886) in 1864 and Melvina H. Knight (1850-1929) in 1894, fathering a total of 9 children with Miller. He died on 17 November 1919 in Satsop, Washington and was buried in Masonic Cemetery in Elma, Washington.

== Military service ==
Shahan enlisted in the Army as a corporal on 1 July 1861 in Clarksburg, West Virginia and was mustered in to Company A of the 1st West Virginia Cavalry. On 6 May 1865, at the Battle of Sailor's Creek in Virginia, Shahan captured the flag of the Confederate 76th Georgia Infantry.

Shahan's Medal of Honor citation reads:

The President of the United States of America, in the name of Congress, takes pleasure in presenting the Medal of Honor to Corporal Emisire Shahan, United States Army, for extraordinary heroism on 6 April 1865, while serving with Company A, 1st West Virginia Cavalry, in action at Deatonsville (Sailor's Creek), Virginia, for capture of flag of 76th Georgia Infantry (Confederate States of America).

— E. M. Stanton, Secretary of War
