= Daniel A. Woods =

Daniel A. Woods (1840s – August 10, 1894) was an American soldier and recipient of the Medal of Honor.

He was born in the 1840s in Ohio County, West Virginia although sources dispute the exact birth year. Woods served as a private in the 1st West Virginia Cavalry. He earned his medal on April 6, 1865, at the Battle of Sayler's Creek, Virginia. Woods died on August 10, 1894, and is buried in Greenwood Cemetery, Wheeling, West Virginia.

== Medal of Honor Citation ==
For extraordinary heroism on 6 April 1865, in action at Deatonsville (Sailor's Creek), Virginia, for capture of flag of 18th Florida Infantry (Confederate States of America).
