= Wilmon W. Blackmar =

Wilmon Whilldin Blackmar
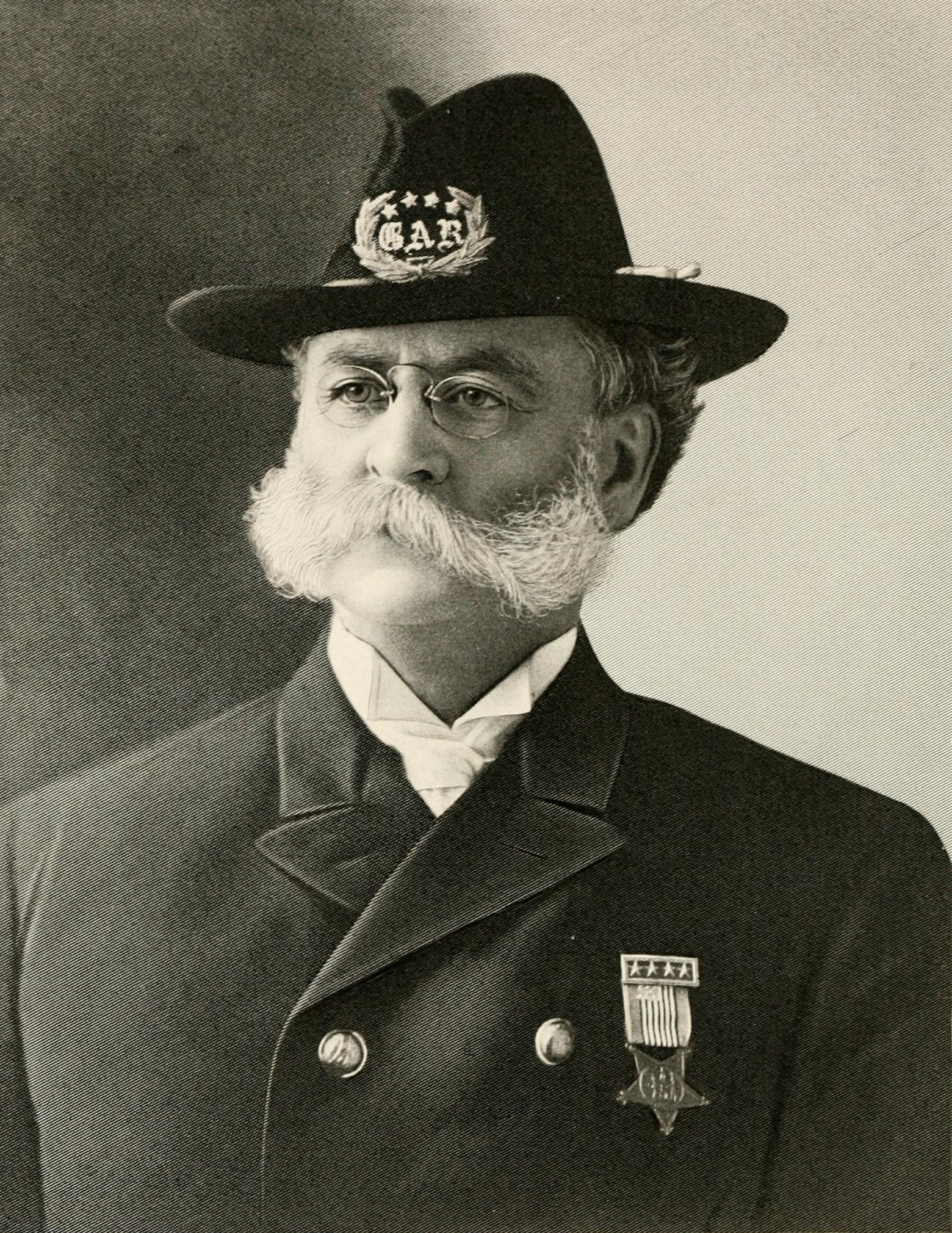
- Born: July 25, 1841; Bristol, Pennsylvania, U.S.
- Died: July 16, 1905 (aged 63); Boise, Idaho, U.S.
- Burial place: Cedar Grove Cemetery, Dorchester, Massachusetts
- Military career
- Allegiance: United States of America
- Branch: U.S. Army (Union Army)
- Service years: 1861 — July 8, 1865
- Rank: Captain
- Units: 15th Regiment Pennsylvania Volunteer Cavalry; 1st Regiment West Virginia Volunteer Cavalry
- Conflicts: American Civil War: Battle of Antietam; Chickamauga Campaign; Battle of Stones River; Battle of Chickamauga; Valley Campaigns of 1864; Appomattox Campaign; Battle of Five Forks; Battle of Appomattox Station
- Awards: Medal of Honor
- Other work: Lawyer

Wilmon Whilldin Blackmar (July 25, 1841 – July 16, 1905) was a United States military officer who fought with the Union Army as a member of the 15th Pennsylvania Cavalry and the 1st West Virginia Cavalry during the American Civil War. He received his country's highest award for bravery during combat, the U.S. Medal of Honor, for his "extraordinary heroism" for taking the initiative, during a critical stage of the Battle of Five Forks on April 1, 1865, to lead a successful advance upon the enemy while fighting with the 1st West Virginia Cavalry. His award was conferred on October 23, 1897.

An advisor to several Massachusetts governors during the late 1880s and early 1900s and Commander-in-Chief of the Grand Army of the Republic (1904–1905), he then became only the second person in Massachusetts history to lie in state at the Massachusetts State House in Boston following his death in 1905.

== Formative years ==
Born on July 25, 1841, in Bristol, Pennsylvania, Wilmar W. Blackmar was a son of the Rev. Joseph Blackmar, a Massachusetts clergyman, and Eliza (Philbrick) Blackmar. After relocating with his parents to Boston, Massachusetts, during his early childhood, he received his initial education at Boston's Brimmer Grammar School and the State Normal School in Bridgewater. He then began his higher education experience at Phillips Exeter Academy in Exeter, New Hampshire.

== Civil War ==
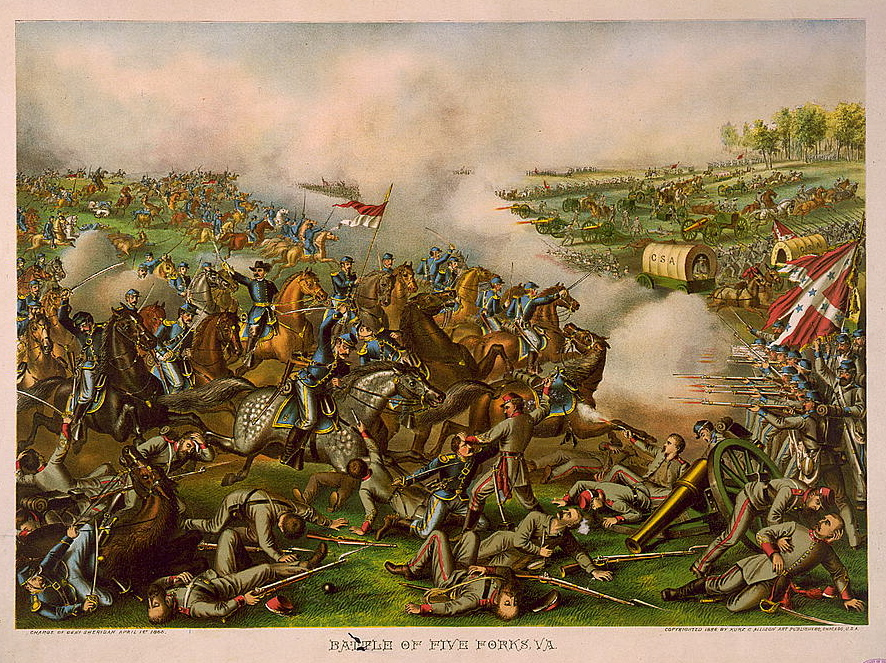
Battle of Five Forks, Virginia, April 1, 1865

During the summer of the second year of the American Civil War, Wilmon Blackmar left Phillips Exeter to enlist for military service. After enrolling in Philadelphia on August 22, 1862, at the age of 21, he officially mustered in for duty at Carlisle in Cumberland County on August 30 as a private with Company K of the 15th Pennsylvania Cavalry (also known as the 160th Pennsylvania Volunteers or "Anderson Cavalry"). He then participated in various operations associated with the Army of the Potomac.

After fighting with his regiment in the Battle of Antietam on September 17, 1862, he was promoted to the rank of corporal. On March 1, 1863, he advanced to the rank of sergeant and then advanced again to first sergeant on May 5 of that same year, according to historian Samuel P. Bates (or, per Grand Army of the Republic records, to the rank of "orderly sergeant"). He then participated with the 15th Pennsylvania Cavalry in the Chickamauga Campaign from August 21 to September 20, 1863, engaging in a well-publicized charge on Confederate States Army troops at Murfreesboro, Tennessee, and also fighting in the Battle of Chickamauga (September 18–20).

On May 15, 1864, Blackmar was honorably discharged from the 15th Pennsylvania Cavalry in order to accept a commission as 1st lieutenant of Company H, 1st West Virginia Volunteer Cavalry. He was then placed on detached duty as provost marshal to the 14th Pennsylvania Cavalry and assigned to the staff of Colonel James Martinus Schoonmaker, who had founded and led that cavalry regiment before being appointed as a cavalry brigade commander under Union Major General Philip H. Sheridan. Assigned to the staff of Brigadier General William Henry Powell during the Valley Campaigns of 1864, Blackmar received a commendation from his superiors, "for having saved, by a most hazardous ride, [his] brigade from capture by the forces of General Jubal A. Early", according to Grand Army of the Republic records.

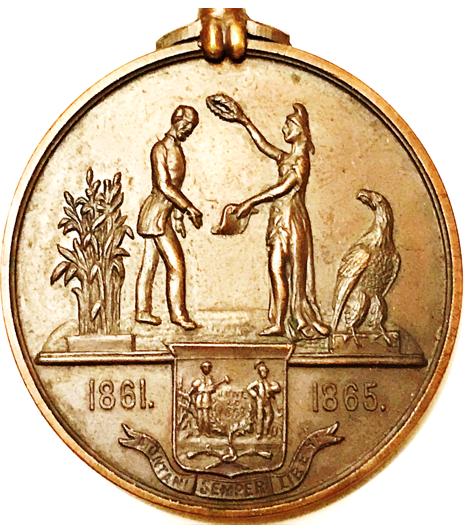
This "Honorably Discharged" medal was given to soldiers who served with West Virginia units during the Civil War.

Assigned in 1865 to the staff of Brevet Major General Henry Capehart, who had been placed in charge of a brigade in the division commanded by Brevet Major General George Armstrong Custer, Blackmar participated in the opening battles of the Appomattox Campaign, and then performed the act of valor for which he was personally brevetted in the field as a captain that same day by Custer and was then also later awarded the U.S. Medal of Honor. Realizing that the Union Army was in trouble during the Battle of Five Forks, Virginia, on April 1, 1865, Blackmar took the initiative to order his men and other Union troops to rapidly form a line and charge the enemy, an action which forced the Confederate troops to disperse.

With the Appomattox Campaign successfully concluded and the war officially declared over, Blackmar honorably mustered out at the rank of captain on July 8, 1865.

== Post-war life ==
Following his honorable discharge from the military, Blackmar returned to Phillips Exeter, where he had been awarded the school's history prize in 1864, and then went on to complete his legal studies at the Harvard Law School in 1868. Admitted to the Suffolk Bar following his graduation, he served as a lawyer during the 1880s and 1890s, a fact confirmed by his 1894 application for a United States passport, which also noted that he was a permanent resident of Hingham, Massachusetts who was a 53-year-old man who was 5'7" tall with dark hair and blue eyes with an oval face with a high forehead, straight nose, round chin, and fair complexion.

After marrying Helen R. Brewster, a Boston resident who was a daughter of John R. Brewster, on November 17, 1880, he and his wife then divided their time between their permanent residence at 72 Commonwealth Avenue in Boston and their summer home, "World's End Farm," in Hingham. Having joined his local chapter of the Grand Army of the Republic in 1867 (John A. Andrew Post No. 15, Boston), he also remained active with the G.A.R for the remainder of his life, helping to establish Boston's Edward W. Kinsley Post (No. 113) and serving in various positions at the organization's national level.

In 1881 he was elected as an original companion of the Massachusetts Commandery of the Military Order of the Loyal Legion of the United States (MOLLUS). He was assigned MOLLUS insignia number 2276.

Upon retirement, he served as Judge Advocate General for several Massachusetts governors, and was also elected Commander-in-Chief of the Grand Army of the Republic in 1904, a position he continued to hold until his death.

== Death and State House tribute ==
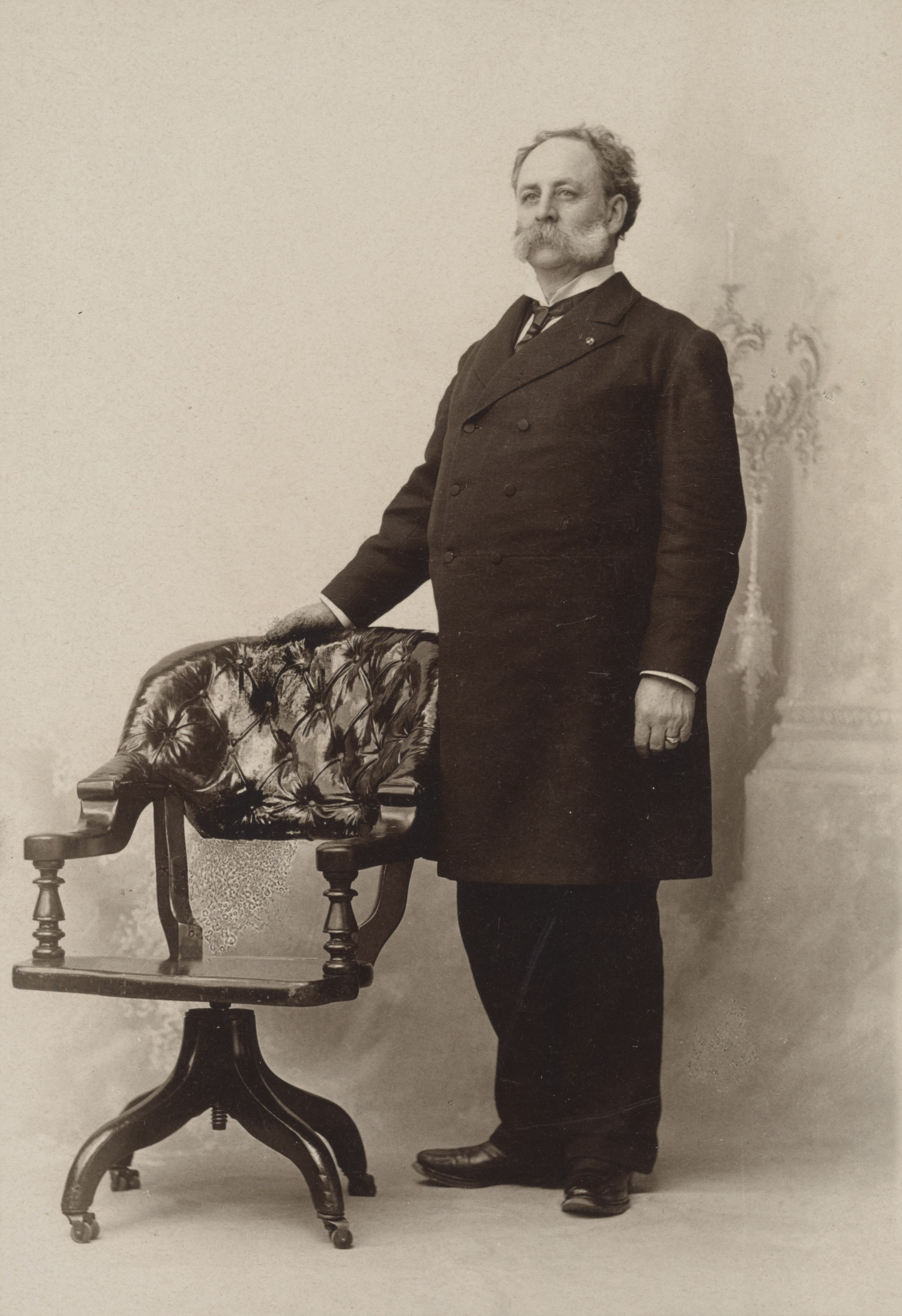
Photographed in 1893 with Grant's chair from Appomattox, Blackmar donated the chair to the Smithsonian Institution in 1905.

In 1905, Blackmar became only the second person in the history of Massachusetts to lie in state at the Massachusetts State House. He died in Boise, Idaho, on July 16 while engaged in a lengthy series of visits to Grand Army of the Republic posts which he had scheduled in his capacity as the G.A.R.'s Commander-in-Chief. His remains were returned to Boston and public tribute was paid to him at the State House. Blackmar was then interred at the Cedar Grove Cemetery in Dorchester, Massachusetts.

When it was read in August 1905, his will revealed that he had left $3,000 to Lexington, Kentucky resident Nancy T. Creel, the daughter of the nurse who had rendered care to Blackmar during the American Civil War as he recuperated from typhoid fever. He also made significant contributions to the Grand Army of the Republic and a gift to the U.S. government of "the chair in which General Ulysses S. Grant sat when arranging the surrender of General Robert E. Lee, of the Confederate Army at Appomattox," according to newspaper reports from that era.

== Medal of Honor citation ==
Rank and organization: Lieutenant, Company H, 1st West Virginia Cavalry. Place and date: At Five Forks, Va., April 1, 1865. Entered service at: ------. Birth: Bristol, Pa. Date of issue: October 23, 1897. Citation:

The President of the United States of America, in the name of Congress, takes pleasure in presenting the Medal of Honor to Lieutenant Wilmon Whilldin Blackmar, United States Army, for extraordinary heroism on April 1, 1865, while serving with Company H, 1st West Virginia Cavalry, in action at Five Forks, Virginia. At a critical stage of the battle, without orders, Lieutenant Blackmar led a successful advance upon the enemy.

== See also ==
- List of American Civil War Medal of Honor recipients: A–F
- Massachusetts in the American Civil War
- Pennsylvania in the American Civil War

Preceded by John C. Black	Commander-in-Chief of the Grand Army of the Republic; 1904 – 1905	Succeeded by John Rigdon King
