= William Houlton =

Medal of Honor recipient

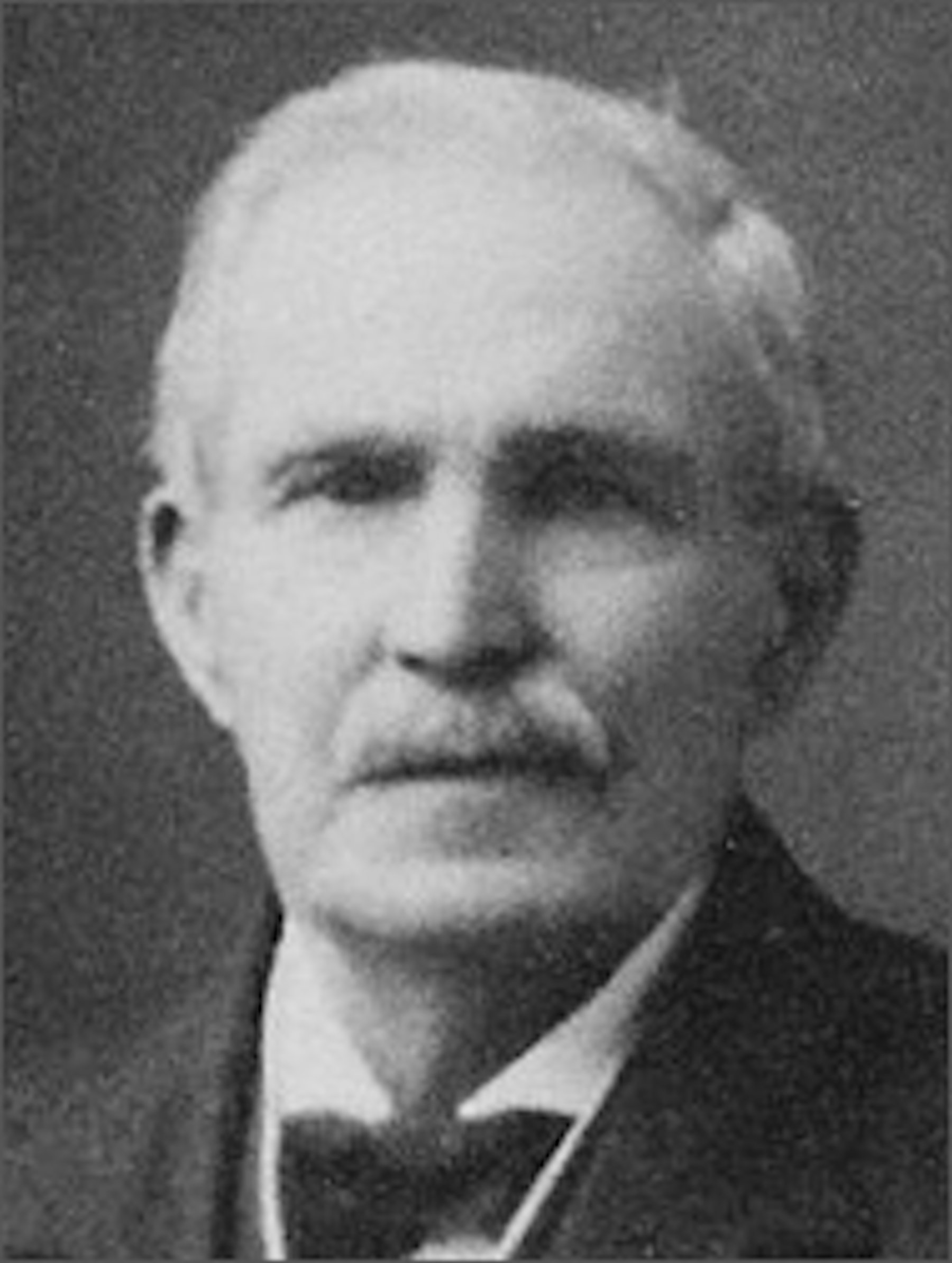
William Houlton in 1905

William Houlton (September 1, 1835 - February 13, 1918) was an American soldier and recipient of the Medal of Honor who served in the Union Army during the American Civil War.

== Biography ==
Houlton was born on September 1, 1835, in Clymer, New York. He served as a Commissary Sergeant in the 1st West Virginia Cavalry. He earned the Medal of Honor for "Capture of flag." on April 6, 1865, in action at the Battle of Sayler's Creek, Virginia. He died on February 13, 1918, in Abilene, Kansas and is now buried in Abilene Cemetery, Kansas.
