= Charles Schorn =

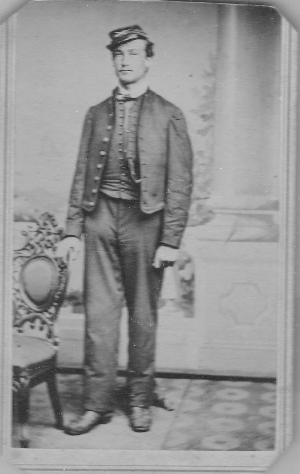
- Born: 1 May 1842; Germany
- Died: 25 March 1915 (aged 72); Sassafras, West Virginia
- Burial place: Sacred Heart Cemetery, Pomeroy, Ohio
- Military career
- Allegiance: United States (Union)
- Branch: Army
- Service years: 1861-1865
- Rank: Chief Bugler
- Units: Company M, 1st West Virginia Cavalry
- Conflicts: Appomattox, Virginia
- Awards: Medal of Honor

Charles Schorn (1 May 1842 - 25 March 1915) was a bugler in the United States Army who was awarded the Medal of Honor for gallantry during the American Civil War. Schorn was awarded the medal on 3 May 1865 for actions performed at the Battle of Appomattox Courthouse on 8 April 1865.

== Personal life ==
Schorn was born in Germany on 1 May 1842 and lived in Sassafras, West Virginia. He married Mary Gloeckner and fathered three children. He died on 25 March 1915 in Sassafras and is buried in Sacred Heart Cemetery in Pomeroy, Ohio.

== Military service ==
Schorn enlisted in the Army as a bugler on 8 September 1861 at Mason City, West Virginia. He was mustered into Company M of the 1st West Virginia Cavalry. On 30 June 1863, he was promoted to chief bugler and transferred from Company M to the 1st's Field & Staff company. On 8 April 1865, at the Battle of Appomattox Courthouse, he captured the flag of the Confederate Sumter Flying Artillery.

Schorn's Medal of Honor citation reads:

The President of the United States of America, in the name of Congress, takes pleasure in presenting the Medal of Honor to Chief Bugler Charles Schorn, United States Army, for extraordinary heroism on 8 April 1865, while serving with Company M, 1st West Virginia Cavalry, in action at Appomattox, Virginia, for capture of flag of the Sumter Flying Artillery (Confederate States of America).

— E. M. Stanton, Secretary of War

Schorn was mustered out of the Army on 8 July 1865.
