= Hugh P. Boon =

- Born: July 28, 1831; Washington, Pennsylvania
- Died: January 14, 1908 (aged 76); Washington, Pennsylvania
- Military career
- Allegiance: United States of America
- Branch: United States Army
- Service years: August 1861 to 8 July 1865
- Rank: Captain
- Unit: 1st Regiment West Virginia Volunteer Cavalry - Company B
- Conflicts: Battle of Sayler's Creek
- Awards: Medal of Honor

Captain Hugh P. Boon (July 28, 1831 – January 14, 1908) was an American soldier who fought in the American Civil War. Boon received the country's highest award for bravery during combat, the Medal of Honor, for his action during the Battle of Sailor's Creek in Virginia on 6 April 1865. He was honored with the award on 3 May 1865.

== Biography ==
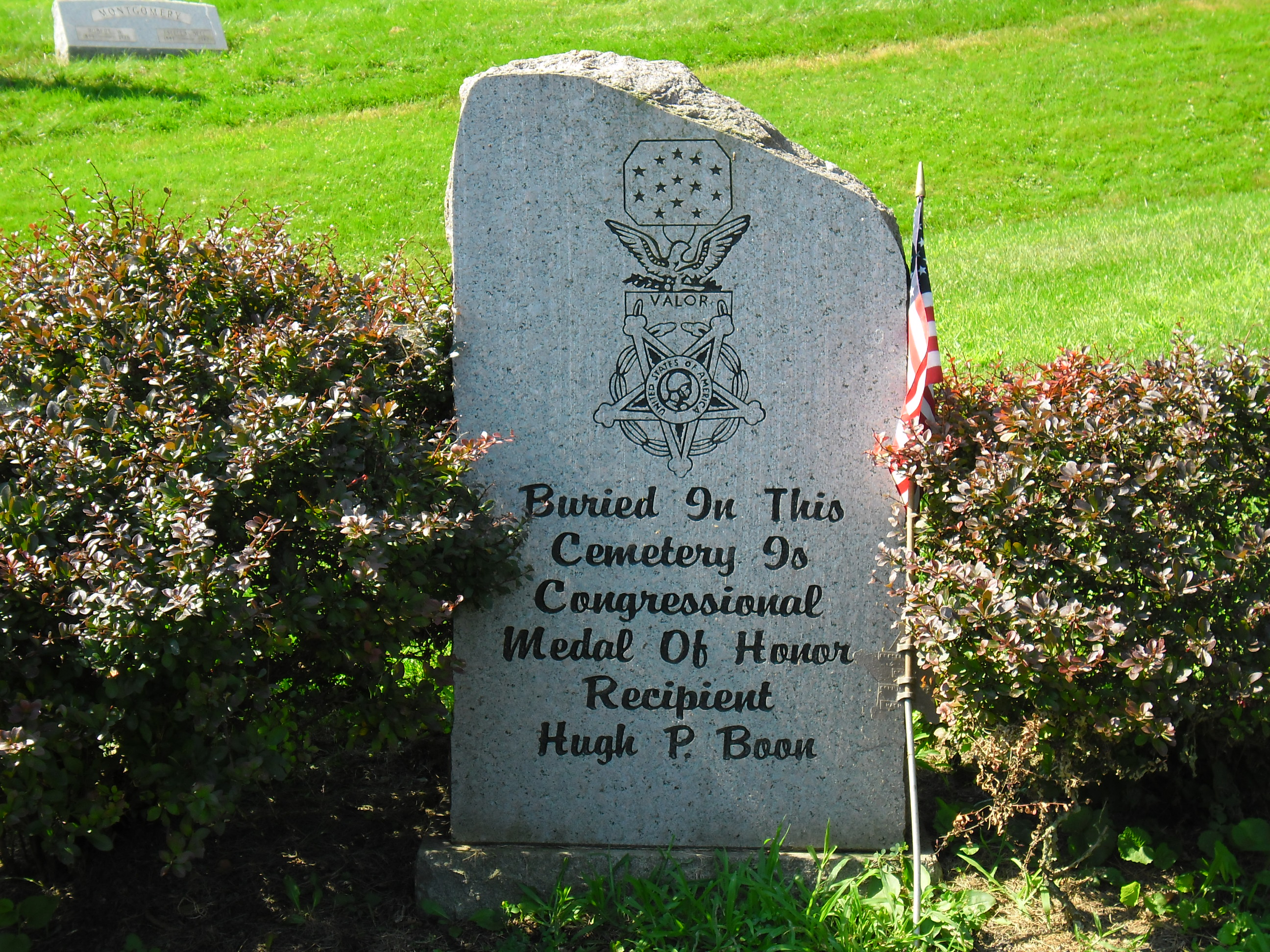
Marker at Washington (PA) Cemetery showing Boon is buried there

Boon was born on 28 July 1831 to James and Margaret Miller Boone in Washington, Pennsylvania. Prior to the outbreak of the war, Boon was involved in the grocery business. He first joined the war efforts as a volunteer in the three-month service and later enlisted into the 1st Regiment West Virginia Volunteer Cavalry in August 1861, where he was eventually promoted to captain.

On 6 April 1865 Boon was in command of Company B, 1st West Virginia Cavalry. His company was on the right flank of the Cavalry charge commanded by General George A. Custer's 3rd Brigade against the center of the Confederate defenses. This charge was noted as the battle of Marshalls Crossroads, Saylers Creek. During the charge, Boone noticed the advance of the Georgia 10th Infantry to his right front. Being on the far right flank of the Union line, Captain Boon, turned his company to the right to engage the Georgians and protect the flank. During this charge, Captain Boone "cut down" the Georgia 10th flag bearer and captured the battle flag. It is for this act of gallantry that he was presented with the Medal of Honor. On the 10th of May, 1864 during the battle of Wytheville Virginia, Boon was seriously injured, a bullet piercing through his neck close to his spinal cord, an injury which troubled him throughout the rest of his life. Captain Boon served as the commanding officer of Company B, 1st W.Va Cavalry continuously until the end of the war, including but not limited to a cavalry action near Devils Den and the wheatfield, during the battle of Gettysburg, Pennsylvania. He was present with his unit at the surrender of the Confederate Army under General Robert E. Lee at Appomattox Virginia only 3 days after the battle of Saylers Creek.

After the war Boon returned to the grocery business for a while but soon left to go into farming, a trade in which his family was involved while growing up. In October 1866 he married Hannah J. Cook, with whom he had one child. He was later a clerk in the A. B. Caldwell Co store. He died on January 14, 1908, after a period of illness.

== Medal of Honor citation ==
Capture of flag.

== See also ==
- List of American Civil War Medal of Honor recipients: A–F
