= Francis M. Cunningham =

Francis Marion Cunningham
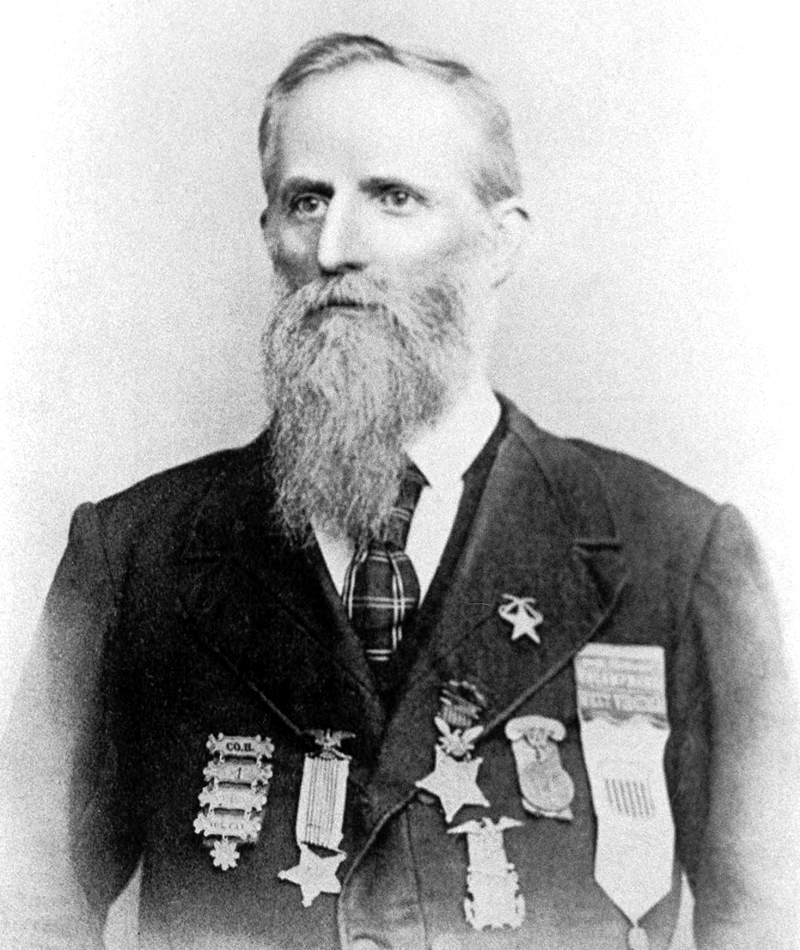
- Francis M. Cunningham, c. 1907
- Born: December 12, 1837; Upper Turkeyfoot Township, Pennsylvania
- Died: May 11, 1919 (aged 81); Ohiopyle, Pennsylvania
- Burial place: Sugar Grove Cemetery, Ohiopyle, Pennsylvania
- Military career
- Allegiance: United States of America
- Branch: United States Army
- Rank: First Lieutenant
- Unit: 1st West Virginia Volunteer Cavalry Regiment - Company H
- Conflicts: American Civil War: Battle of Kernstown I; Battle of Hanover; Battle of Gettysburg; Battle of Hagerstown; Battle of Boonsboro; Battle of Mine Run; Battle of Cove Mountain; Battle of Lynchburg; Battle of Rutherford's Farm; Battle of Kernstown II; Battle of Moorefield; Valley Campaigns of 1864; Battle of Opequon; Battle of Fisher's Hill; Battle of Cedar Creek; Battle of Waynesboro, Virginia; Appomattox Campaign; Battle of Dinwiddie Court House; Battle of Five Forks; Battle of Sailor's Creek; Appomattox Court House
- Awards: Medal of Honor

Francis Marion Cunningham (December 12, 1837 – May 11, 1919) was an American soldier and native of Pennsylvania who fought with Company H of the 1st West Virginia Cavalry during the American Civil War. Cunningham received the United States' highest award for bravery during combat, the Medal of Honor, for his action during the Battle of Sailor's Creek in Virginia on April 6, 1865. The award was conferred on May 3, 1865.

== Biography ==
Born in Upper Turkeyfoot Township, Pennsylvania, on December 12, 1837 (alternate birth date December 31), Francis Marion Cunningham was the son of Somerset County natives Robert Cunningham (1808–1889) and Sarah (Pinkerton) Cunningham (1808–1880).

During the 1850s, he resided in Lower Turkeyfoot Township with his parents and siblings: Rachel S. (1833–1906), who later wed Abraham Williams; Nancy (1835–1923), who later wed John Mason; James Lawrence (c. 1839–1864), who became a Union Army soldier and died in 1864 while being held as a prisoner of war by the Confederate Army during the American Civil War; Sebastian (c. 1840–1911); Thaddeus S. (1842–1925); Clara/Clarissa T. (1843–1911), who later wed Elijah S. Harbaugh; Matthew (1845–1887); W. Ross (c. 1847–1937); Martha Alice (1850–1912), who later wed Reuben H. Leonard; Sarah (1852–1862); and Agnes.

By 1860, he had relocated to Stewart Township, Pennsylvania. On August 26, 1861, in Dunbar Township, he wed Sarah J. Skinner.

== Civil War ==
Francis Cunningham became one of Pennsylvania's early responders to President Abraham Lincoln's call for 75,000 volunteers to help preserve America's union when he enlisted for Civil War military service during the United States summer of 1861. After enrolling at Springfield, Pennsylvania on July 25, he then officially mustered in for duty with Company H of the 1st West Virginia Cavalry. According to a later newspaper account of his military service, "Cunningham was one of 67 Fayette countians who purchased horses on their account and rode to West Virginia" in order to enlist. He then saw action with his regiment in multiple key battles from the war's early years through its closure (see list in infobox). In 1863, as "an orderly sergeant at the battle of Gettysburg he took command of his company when the officers were killed and held the command to the end of the war." Upon expiration of his initial three-year term of service, he re-enlisted for a second, three-year term on December 23, 1863.

In early April 1865, during the Battle of Sailor's Creek (also known as "Sayler's Creek") in Virginia, Cunningham performed the act of valor for which he would later be awarded the Medal of Honor. Four decades later, during an interview for the book, Deeds of Valor from Records in the Archives of the United States Government: How American Heroes Won the Medal of Honor, he spoke about what happened that day:

"For six days we had been pounding at the rebels and for six days they had been pounding at us.... It was on the afternoon of April 6th that we again came up with them in a strong position on the thickly wooded banks of Sailor's Creek. They were behind rude fortifications and the thick growth of underbrush kept their numbers concealed from us. We didn't know how many rebels there were in those ditches until we charged.... I was one of the men lowered to terra firma swiftly, my fine black charger being killed under me. We were repulsed, and as we fell back over logs and interleaving vines, the rebel volleys continued thinning out the ranks. Men and beasts were floundering together in the dense thicket.

"I groped about with my eyes blinded with the smoke and fortunately bumped squarely into a phlegmatic mule with a Confederate saddle on....

"I mounted him and hurried back through the woods to the clearing, where our forces were rallying....

"Just as I reached the rallying troops the bugle sounded 'Charge' again and back we went at those breastworks over stumps and through drooping branches. It took my mule just about four jumps to show that in an obstacle race he could outclass all others. He laid back his ears and frisked over logs and flattened out like a jackrabbit, when he had a chance to sprint. Soon I was ahead, far ahead of the rest of the boys. That mule never even stopped when he came to the breastworks. He switched his tail and sailed right over among the rebs, landing near a rebel color-bearer of the Twelfth Virginia Infantry.

"About all that I can remember of what followed was that the mule and I went after him. The color-bearer was a big brawny chap and he put up a game fight. But that mule had some new sidesteps and posterior upper-cuts that put the reb out of the game.

"A sabre slash across the right arm made him drop his colors and I grabbed them before they touched the ground."

The book's editors added that Cunningham was wounded twice before capturing the enemy's flag, and noted that Brevet Major-General George Armstrong Custer was so impressed by what he saw as he watched Cunningham in action that "he at once placed him on his staff, and later recommended him for the Medal of Honor."

As a member of Custer's staff, Cunningham witnessed the surrender by Robert E. Lee, commanding general of the Confederate States Army, to Ulysses S. Grant, commanding general of the Union Army, at the Surrender at Appomattox.

== Post-war life ==
Following his honorable discharge from the military, Cunningham returned to his home in Ohiopyle, Pennsylvania, where he continued to reside with his wife until her death in 1915.

Four years later, he developed blood poisoning and tetanus after stepping on a rusty nail while making improvements to an aging structure in Stewart Township. Cunningham died in Ohiopyle on May 11, 1919. Following funeral services on May 14, he was laid to rest beside his wife at the Sugar Grove Cemetery in Ohiopyle. The day after his funeral, his local newspaper reported on his funeral as follows:

Rev. Francis M. Cunningham was buried with honors of war yesterday afternoon from the Baptist church at Ohiopyle, with the William F. Kurtz Post, No. 104, Grand Army of the Republic, and the Uniontown Grand Army Post in charge. The funeral was the largest held in Stewart township in years, friends of the deceased from all parts of the township and from more distant points attending. Rev. L. S. Colborn of Columbus, O., was in charge of the services, delivering a beautiful and impressive sermon. The floral tributes were numerous and beautiful. Six grandsons of the deceased served as pallbearers. Civil War veterans from here in attendance were W. P. Clark, J. E. Jones, L. W. Wolfe, Captain Edmund Dunn and C. H. Whiteley.

== Medal of Honor citation ==
Capture of battle flag of 12th Virginia Infantry (Confederate States of America) in hand-to-hand battle while wounded.

== See also ==
- Archibald H. Rowand, Jr.
- List of Medal of Honor recipients
- List of American Civil War Medal of Honor recipients: A–F
