= Charles E. Capehart =

US Army officer and Medal of Honor recipient (1833–1911)

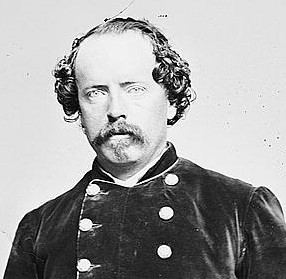
- Born: 1833; Johnstown, Pennsylvania, U.S.
- Died: 1911 (aged 77–78); Washington D.C., U.S.
- Burial place: Arlington National Cemetery
- Military career
- Allegiance: United States; Union
- Branch: United States Army; Union Army
- Service years: 1861–1865
- Rank: Lieutenant Colonel
- Commands: 1st Regiment West Virginia Volunteer Cavalry
- Conflicts: American Civil War • Battle of Gettysburg • Fight at Monterey Pass
- Awards: Medal of Honor

Charles E. Capehart (1833–1911) was an officer in the U.S. Cavalry during the American Civil War. He received the Medal of Honor for action following the Battle of Gettysburg on July 4, 1863.

== Military service ==
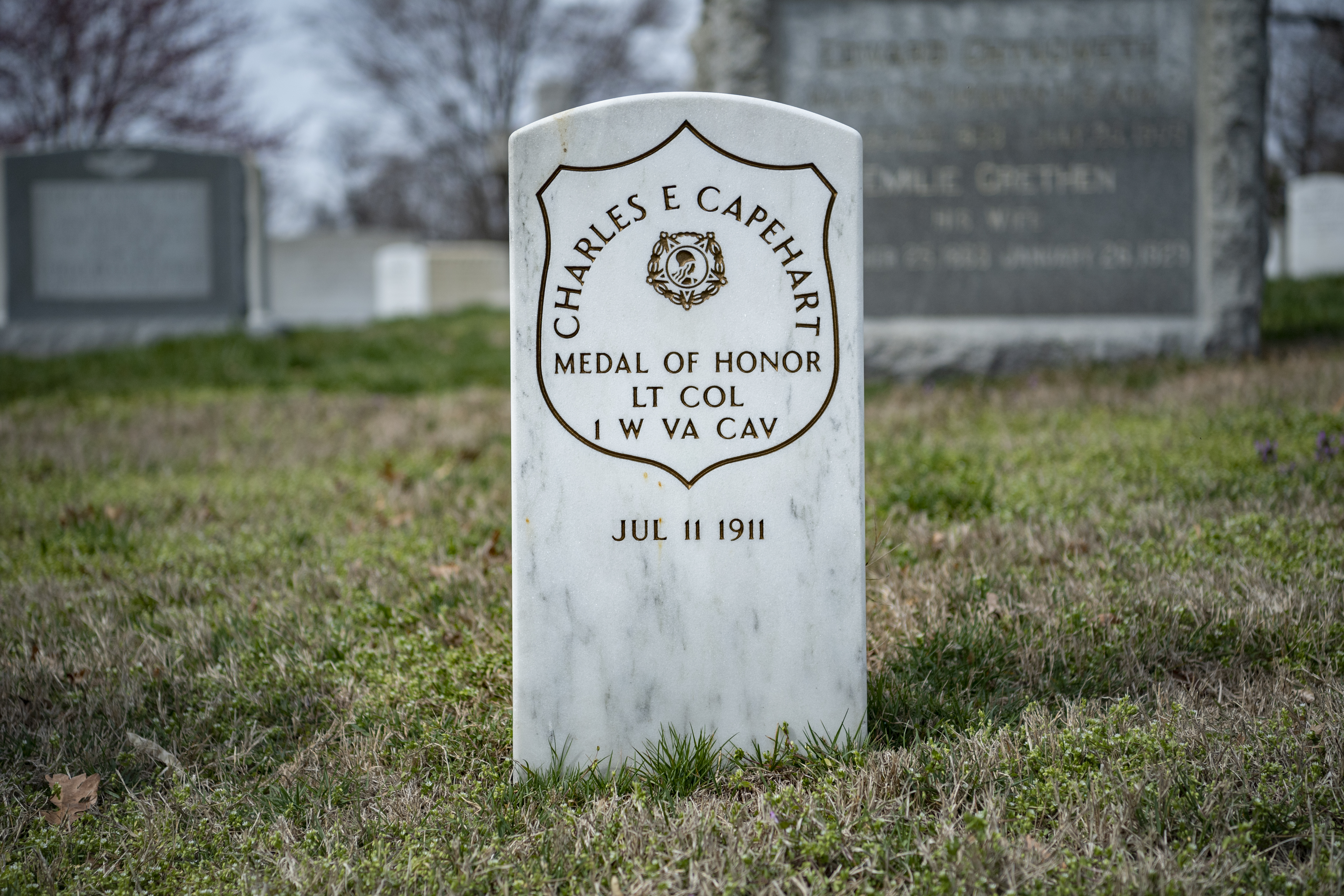
Grave at Arlington National Cemetery

Capehart enlisted in the Union Army and was commissioned captain and placed in command of Company A, 1st West Virginia Cavalry. He was promoted to major on June 6, 1863. Major Capehart assumed command of the regiment during the Battle of Gettysburg when Colonel Nathaniel P. Richmond had to assume command of the regiment's brigade after brigade commander Elon J. Farnsworth was killed leading a charge. On July 4, 1863, Capehart's regiment charged down a mountainside at night during a thunderstorm, attacking and capturing a retreating Confederate wagon train. This act would lead to the awarding of the Medal of Honor.

Capehart was promoted to lieutenant colonel on August 1, 1864. His brother, General Henry Capehart was also awarded the Medal of Honor for his actions in the Civil War. Capehart died on July 11, 1911, and was buried at Arlington National Cemetery, Arlington, Virginia.

== Medal of Honor citation ==
For The President of the United States of America, in the name of Congress, takes pleasure in presenting the Medal of Honor to Major Charles E. Capehart, United States Army, for extraordinary heroism on 4 July 1863, while serving with 1st West Virginia Cavalry, in action at Monterey Mountain, Pennsylvania. While commanding the regiment, Major Capehart charged down the mountain side at midnight, in a heavy rain, upon the enemy's fleeing wagon train. Many wagons were captured and destroyed and many prisoners taken.

Date of Issue: April 7, 1898

Action Date: July 4, 1863

== See also ==
- List of Medal of Honor recipients for the Battle of Gettysburg
- List of American Civil War Medal of Honor recipients: A–F
