= Richard Boury =

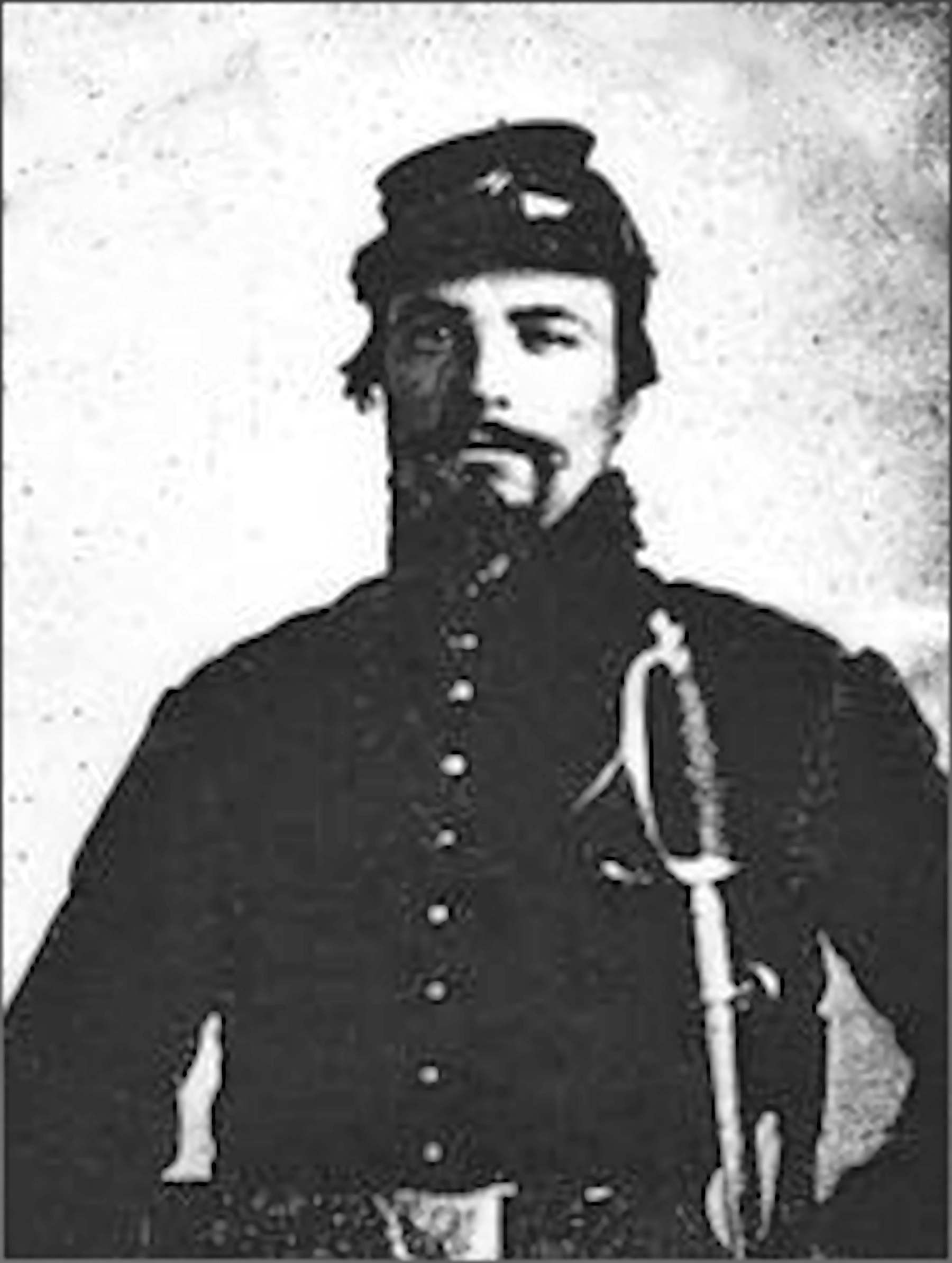
- Sergeant Richard Boury
- Born: June 15, 1830; Monroe County, Ohio, U.S.
- Died: July 5, 1914 (aged 84); Parkersburg, West Virginia, U.S.
- Military career
- Allegiance: United States of America
- Branch: United States Army
- Rank: Sergeant
- Unit: 1st Regiment West Virginia Volunteer Cavalry - Company C
- Awards: Medal of Honor

Sergeant Richard Boury (June 15, 1830 to July 5, 1914) was an American soldier who fought in the American Civil War. Boury received the country's highest award for bravery during combat, the Medal of Honor, for his action in Charlottesville, Virginia on 5 March 1865. He was honored with the award on 26 March 1865.

== Biography ==
Boury was born in Monroe County, Ohio on 15 July 1830. He enlisted into the 1st West Virginia Volunteer Cavalry at Wirt Courthouse in West Virginia.

He died on 5 July 1914 in West Virginia. His remains are interred at the Parkersburg Memorial Gardens.

== Medal of Honor citation ==
Capture of flag.

== See also ==
- List of American Civil War Medal of Honor recipients: A–F
