= Thomas Anderson (Medal of Honor) =

United States Army Medal of Honor recipient

Thomas A. Anderson
- Born: July 12, 1841; Washington County, Pennsylvania
- Died: September 8, 1912 (aged 71); Amwell Township, Pennsylvania
- Military career
- Allegiance: United States of America
- Branch: United States Army (Union Army)
- Rank: Corporal
- Units: 1st Regiment West Virginia Volunteer Cavalry, Company I
- Conflicts: See battles: American Civil War; Jackson's Valley campaign; Battle of McDowell; Battle of Cross Keys; Battle of Port Republic; Northern Virginia Campaign; Battle of Cedar Mountain; Second Battle of Bull Run; Battle of Chantilly; Gettysburg campaign; Battle of Hanover; Battle of Gettysburg; Battle of Williamsport; Battle of Boonsboro; Battle of Mine Run; Battle of Cove Mountain; Battle of Lynchburg; Battle of Rutherford's Farm; Valley Campaigns of 1864; Second Battle of Kernstown; Battle of Moorefield; Battle of Opequon; Battle of Fisher's Hill; Battle of Cedar Creek; Battle of Waynesboro, Virginia; Appomattox campaign; Battle of Dinwiddie Court House; Battle of Five Forks; Battle of Sailor's Creek; Battle of Appomattox Station; Battle of Appomattox Court House
- Awards: Medal of Honor

Thomas A. Anderson (July 12, 1841 – September 8, 1912) was an American soldier who fought with the Union Army as a corporal in Company I of the 1st West Virginia Cavalry during the American Civil War. He was awarded his nation's highest award for valor, the U.S. Medal of Honor, for capturing the flag of a Confederate regiment during the Battle of Appomattox Station on April 8, 1865. The award was conferred on May 3 of that same year.

== Formative years ==
Born on July 12, 1841, Thomas A. Anderson was a native of Washington County, Pennsylvania.

== Civil War ==
On November 18, 1861, at the age of 20, Thomas A. Anderson enrolled for military service at Wheeling, West Virginia. He then officially mustered in for duty with Company I of the 1st West Virginia Cavalry. Assigned to guard lines of the Baltimore and Ohio Railroad in what is now West Virginia during the opening months of 1862, Anderson and his fellow 1st Virginia Cavalrymen were directed to combat assignments beginning that spring. After fighting at Winchester, Virginia (March 23), they engaged the enemy in operations at Monterey (April 12), Buffalo Gap (May 3), McDowell (May 7), Strasburg (June 1), Cross Keys (June 8), Port Republic (June 9), and White Plains (June 10). Marched east of the Appalachian Mountains, they then re-engaged with the enemy in Culpeper, Fauquier and Fairfax counties, including battles at Cedar Mountain (August 9) and Orange Court House (August 13). Next engaged in Union General John Pope's Northern Virginia Campaign, they participated in operations along the Rapidan River (August 18), Freeman's Ford/Hazel River (August 22), Kelly's Ford (August 22), Sulphur Springs (August 23), Waterloo Bridge (August 23–August 25), and Gainesville (August 28), as well as in the Second Battle of Bull Run (August 28–30). Also engaged in operations at Lewis Ford (August 30), they then fought in the Battle of Chantilly (September 1).

The year of 1863 proved to be an intense one for Anderson and his fellow 1st West Virginia Cavalrymen. Ordered to march for Pennsylvania during the early summer, they participated in the Union Army's tide-turning Gettysburg campaign, including the battles of Hanover (June 30) and Gettysburg (July 1–3), and then helped to drive Confederate troops from Pennsylvania into Maryland and Virginia, engaging in the battles of Williamsport (July 6–16), Boonsboro (July 8), and Mine Run (November 27–December 2). Two days before Christmas that year, Anderson then re-enlisted with the 1st West Virginia Cavalry at New Creek, West Virginia, earning the designation of "Veteran Volunteer".

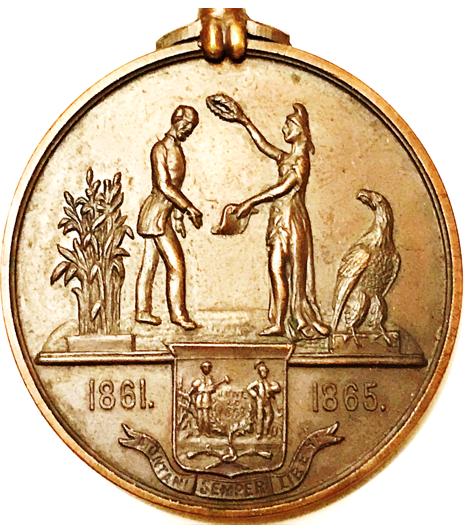
"Honorably Discharged" medal presented to Union soldiers who served with West Virginia military units during the American Civil War.

After emerging from winter quarters in 1864, Anderson and his fellow 1st West Virginia Cavalrymen fought in the battles of Cove Mountain (May 10), Lynchburg (June 17–18) and Rutherford's Farm (July 20) before becoming deeper involved in that year's Valley Campaigns, which included the Second Battle of Kernstown (July 24), and the battles of Moorefield (August 7), Opequon (September 19), Fisher's Hill (September 21–22), Cedar Creek (October 19), and Waynesboro (March 2, 1865) under Major-General Philip H. Sheridan.

Assigned next to the war-ending Appomattox Campaign, Anderson and the 1st West Virginia Cavalry fought in the battles of Dinwiddie Court House (March 31), Five Forks (April 1) and Sailor's Creek (April 6) during the early spring of 1865. It was at this juncture that Anderson performed the act of valor which resulted in his being awarded the U.S. Medal of Honor on May 3. While fighting as a corporal with the 1st West Virginia Cavalry in the Battle of Appomattox Station on April 8, he captured the flag of a Confederate States Army regiment. He was then also present with his regiment for the Battle of Appomattox Court House (April 9).

Anderson officially mustered out from military life at Clarksburg, West Virginia on July 8, 1865.

== Post-war life ==
Sometime around 1866, following his honorable discharge from the military, Anderson married. He and his wife, Margaret (1843-1933), a fellow Pennsylvania native, then became the parents of: Elizabeth Ann (c. 1867-1872), Abram (b. January 1874), Sarah (b. August 1877), Lucinda (1876-1863), and Ida (1883-1969), all of whom were also natives of Pennsylvania.

By 1900, Anderson and his son, Abram, were farming their family's land in West Bethlehem Township, Washington County, Pennsylvania. Also residing with them were Thomas Anderson's wife, Margaret, and their other children: Sarah, Lucinda, and Ida.

Anderson died at his home in Amwell Township, Pennsylvania on September 8, 1912, and was buried at the Ten Mile Dunkard Church Cemetery in Lone Pine, Pennsylvania.

== Medal of Honor citation ==
Rank and organization: Corporal, Company I, 1st West Virginia Cavalry. Place and date: At Appomattox Station, Va., April 8, 1865. Entered service at: ------. Birth: Washington County, Pa. Date of issue: May 3, 1865. Citation: Capture of Confederate flag. Citation:

The President of the United States of America, in the name of Congress, takes pleasure in presenting the Medal of Honor to Corporal Thomas Anderson, United States Army, for extraordinary heroism on April 8, 1865, while serving with Company I, 1st West Virginia Cavalry, in action at Appomattox Station, Virginia, for the capture of a Confederate flag.

== See also ==
- List of American Civil War Medal of Honor recipients: A–F
- Pennsylvania in the American Civil War
