= Camp Carlisle, Virginia =

Union Army training camp in West Virginia

Camp Carlisle was a Union Army training camp during the American Civil War. It was located on Wheeling Island in the Ohio River at what is now Zane and North Wabash Streets in Wheeling, West Virginia. It operated as Camp Carlisle from December 1861 to August 1862 and then as Camp Willey until October 1862. For the remainder of the war the site was known as the Post and Military Command of Wheeling.
