= Henry Capehart =

US Army officer and Medal of Honor recipient (1825–1895)

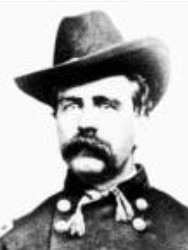
- Henry Capehart
- Born: March 18, 1825; Johnstown, Pennsylvania, US
- Died: April 15, 1895 (aged 70); Fargo, North Dakota, US
- Burial place: Arlington National Cemetery
- Military career
- Allegiance: United States of America; Union
- Branch: United States Army; Union Army
- Service years: 1861–1865
- Rank: Colonel; Brevet Major General
- Commands: 1st Regiment West Virginia Volunteer Cavalry
- Conflicts: American Civil War
- Awards: Medal of Honor

Henry Capehart (March 18, 1825 – April 15, 1895) was a surgeon and officer in the U.S. Cavalry during the American Civil War. He began his military career as the original surgeon for the 1st West Virginia Cavalry Regiment, known then as the 1st Loyal Virginia Cavalry. The regiment consisted mostly of soldiers from Ohio. Most of its fighting occurred in Virginia and what is now West Virginia. He was promoted to colonel of the regiment with a commission date of December 23, 1863. Capehart received the Medal of Honor for saving the life of a drowning soldier while under fire at Greenbrier River, West Virginia, on May 22, 1864. He became a brigade commander, and his veteran soldiers became known as "Capehart's Fighting Brigade".

== Early life ==
Born on March 18, 1825, near Johnstown, Pennsylvania, Capehart attended high school in Pittsburgh. He had a younger brother, Charles E. Capehart, whom he helped raise after their mother's early death. Upon graduating from Jefferson College (now known as Washington & Jefferson College), he moved to Waynesburg in 1847 to continue his medical education and then started a practice in Bridgeport, Ohio, after earning his license in 1849.

== Military service ==
At the outbreak of the Civil War, Capehart left his medical practice in Bridgeport and volunteered for the Union Army. He was appointed regimental surgeon of the 1st West Virginia Cavalry on September 18, 1861. In the latter half of 1863, he participated in the battles of Gettysburg, Bristoe Station, and Mine Run. Upon the recommendations of General Judson Kilpatrick and others, Capehart was made colonel and succeeded Nathaniel P. Richmond, who resigned due to health issues, as commander of the regiment on February 22, 1864.

Beginning in May 1864, Capehart and the 1st West Virginia Cavalry took part in campaigns along the Shenandoah Valley. On May 22, while fording the Greenbrier River under Confederate fire, Private Watson Karr was swept off his horse and down the fast-moving stream. Capehart attempted to catch the soldier as he swept by, but was pulled off his horse as well. Both men were carried down the river and over a waterfall; Capehart then grabbed Karr and pulled him from the water. It was for this action that Capehart was awarded the Medal of Honor decades later, on February 12, 1895. His official citation reads simply: "Saved, under fire, the life of a drowning soldier."

Capehart was assigned command of a cavalry brigade in the Union Army of the Shenandoah and upon recommendation of General George Armstrong Custer was promoted to Brevet Brigadier General on March 13, 1865. This brigade became known as "Capehart's Fighting Brigade". Capehart's brigade was transferred to Custer's division, participating with it in the Appomattox Campaign. Following the Confederate surrender at Appomattox, Capehart was promoted to Brevet Major General on June 17, 1865. He mustered out of service on July 8, 1865, at Wheeling, West Virginia.

He died in 1895 and was buried at Arlington National Cemetery, in Arlington, Virginia.

His brother, Major Charles E. Capehart was also awarded the Medal of Honor for gallantry in the Civil War.

== See also ==
- List of American Civil War Medal of Honor recipients: A–F
