= 1st West Virginia Cavalry Regiment =

United States Civil War military unit

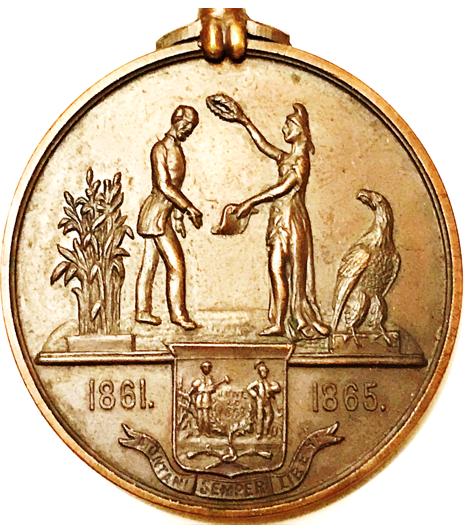
- West Virginia honorable discharge medal
- Active: July 10, 1861, to July 8, 1865
- Country: United States
- Allegiance: (Union (American Civil War)) Union; West Virginia
- Branch: Cavalry
- Engagements: American Civil War 1862: Battle of Kernstown I (6 co.); 1863: Battle of Hanover; Battle of Gettysburg, Battle of Hagerstown, Battle of Boonsboro, Battle of Mine Run; 1864: Battle of Cove Mountain, Battle of Lynchburg, Battle of Rutherford's Farm, Battle of Kernstown II, Battle of Moorefield, Battle of Opequon, Battle of Fisher's Hill, Battle of Cedar Creek, Action at Nineveh 1865: Battle of Waynesboro, Virginia, Battle of Dinwiddie Court House, Battle of Five Forks, Battle of Sailor's Creek, Battle of Appomattox Station, Battle of Appomattox Court House

Commanders
- Colonel: Henry Anisansel 1861–62
- Colonel: Nathaniel P. Richmond 1862–63
- Colonel: Henry Capehart 1863–64
- Lt. Colonel: Charles E. Capehart 1864
- Major: Harvey Farabee 1864–65

The 1st West Virginia Cavalry Regiment served in the Union Army during the American Civil War. Although it started slowly, it became one of the most active and effective of the West Virginia Civil War regiments—and had 14 Medal of Honor recipients, the most for any West Virginia regiment during the war. It was originally called the 1st Virginia Cavalry, not to be confused with the Confederate 1st Virginia Cavalry. Some reports added "Union," "Loyal" or "West" when identifying this regiment. After the Unionist state of West Virginia was officially admitted to the Union in 1863, the regiment became the 1st West Virginia Cavalry Regiment. The National Park Service identifies it as the 1st Regiment, West Virginia Cavalry.

The regiment was organized in Wheeling, Morgantown and Clarksburg in 1861 and consisted of 13 companies, plus an additional company that was attached for most of the war. Members were predominately recruited from Ohio and Pennsylvania and the western Virginia counties of Marshall, Monongalia, Harrison and Ohio. The regiment was often split during the first two years of the war, with detachments spending time guarding the Baltimore & Ohio Railroad and hunting bushwhackers. During July 1863, ten companies of the regiment fought at the Battle of Gettysburg as part of a division.

The regiment began fighting in Virginia's Shenandoah Valley during the second half of 1864. At the beginning of 1865, it became part of the 3rd Brigade in General George Armstrong Custer's Third Division, Cavalry Corps—which, along with another division was under the command of General Philip Sheridan. Sheridan's two cavalry divisions were responsible for eliminating Confederate General Jubal Early's Army of the Valley from the war, and also played an important part in the surrender of Confederate General Robert E. Lee's Army of Northern Virginia. After the war, the 1st West Virginia Cavalry participated in the Grand Review of the Armies, and was mustered out on July 8, 1865.

== Formation and organization ==
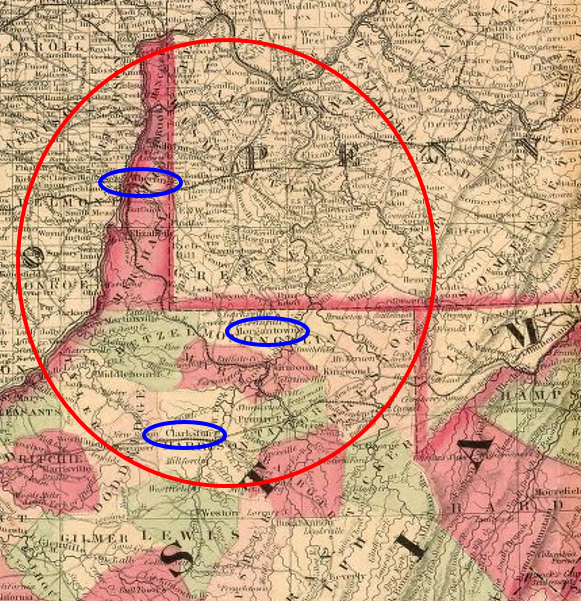
The prime recruiting area for the 1st (West) Virginia Cavalry, especially Wheeling, Morgantown, and Clarksburg (circled in blue).

Although Virginia seceded from the union and joined the Confederate States of America, many people in the northwestern portion of the state preferred to remain loyal to the United States. The first new cavalry regiment formed from this loyal region was originally known as the 1st Virginia Cavalry, and was sometimes noted as a loyal (to the union) regiment to differentiate it from the 1st Virginia Cavalry that was a rebel force for the Confederacy. The regiment eventually was identified as a West Virginia cavalry regiment after the new state was formed in the loyal section of Virginia. Recruiting for the new regiment began during July 1861, and a significant portion of the new recruits were from the cities of Wheeling, Morgantown, and Clarksburg. An analysis of the regiment by the George Tyler Moore Center showed that 32% of the men were from West Virginia, 23% were from Pennsylvania, 16% were from Ohio and the remainder were from Virginia and other states as well as immigrants. One company consisted mostly of men who spoke German.

The regiment's first company, known as the Kelley Lancers, rarely fought with the regiment and was usually attached to General Benjamin Franklin Kelley. Their original captain, John Lowry McGee, eventually became commander of the 3rd West Virginia Cavalry. Another company that was typically detached was called Gilmore's Company. (Note: George Washington Gilmore formed a company of cavalry independently at the request of General George B. McClellan, and Gilmore was its captain. Gilmore's company was originally called the Pennsylvania Dragoons and was formed July 1861 with men from Fayette County, Pennsylvania. An example of it fighting detached is the Wytheville Raid, where it fought with an additional company from the 1st West Virginia Cavalry, an infantry regiment, and another cavalry regiment. Beginning July 14, 1863, Gilmore's Company served with the 2nd West Virginia Cavalry, and finished its service as Company L of that regiment.) The first regiment commander was Colonel Henry Anisansel, who was commissioned on September 7, 1861. Anisansel was a former lieutenant in the Ringgold Cavalry. (Note: The Ringgold Cavalry was an independent cavalry company from Pennsylvania that was formed in 1847. At the start of American Civil War, its captain was John Keys, and its first lieutenant was Henry Annisansel. On September 6, 1861, Annisansel left to become colonel of the First Virginia Cavalry.) His second-in-command was Lieutenant Colonel Nathaniel P. Richmond. Richmond had been a lieutenant in the 13th Indiana Infantry Regiment and an aide-de-camp to General William Rosecrans. The regiment's first chief surgeon was Henry Capehart, who eventually became regiment commander and a general. (Note: Henry Capehart was commissioned as colonel of the regiment on December 23, 1863. His brother, Charles E. Capehart, eventually joined the same regiment. Major Charles E. Capehart took temporary command of the regiment at Gettysburg, and again took command of the regiment after his brother's promotion to brigade commander during September 1864.)

== Early action ==
The regiment's first action is listed as the Battle of Carnifex Ferry on September 10, 1861. However, the two companies present, Gilmore's Company and a company led by Captain William West that eventually became Company I, were held in reserve. The first fighting was done by the Kelley Lancers (Company A) in Romney in October 1861. As the regiment grew, it worked primarily in detachments to hunt bushwhackers. The Baltimore & Ohio Railroad (a.k.a. the B&O Railroad) was an important asset for the Union army, and detachments of the regiment were also used to guard it.

Although the regiment became West Virginia's "most active, and one of the most effective," it did not begin well. During 1862, General Frederick W. Lander brought court martial charges against Anisansel for "failing to obey an order to charge the enemy" at Bloomery Gap. Anisansel was exonerated because he claimed a battle injury made him unable to make the charge. After returning to duty, he resigned on August 6, 1862. He was succeeded by Richmond, his second-in-command. During December 1862, Richmond became involved in a dispute that resulted in his arrest for disobedience. Richmond remained under arrest until he resigned on March 18, 1863.

On May 3, 1863, an 80-man detachment of the regiment was surprise attacked at Warrenton Junction by the notorious guerilla warfare leader Major John S. Mosby and his Mosby's Rangers. They were rescued by the 5th New York Cavalry, but had 17 men killed or wounded, including Major Josiah Steele—who died about one month later from his wounds. During the spring after the Mosby encounter, the regiment was armed with Spencer repeating rifles. Officers from the regiment sent a petition to Secretary of War Edwin Stanton to have Richmond reinstated. Richmond was reinstated as regimental commander on June 12. On June 20, the new state of West Virginia joined the union, and the 1st Virginia Cavalry (loyal) became the 1st West Virginia Cavalry—although many still called it the 1st Virginia.

== Gettysburg Campaign ==
On June 24, the 3rd Brigade, Third Division, Twenty-second Army Corps of the Army of the Potomac departed from its camp in Fairfax, Virginia. Their destination was Gettysburg, Pennsylvania. Richmond commanded the 1st West Virginia Cavalry as it departed with 10 of the regiment's companies as part of this brigade with three other regiments. (Note: Company I and Gilmore's Company participated in the Wytheville Raid during mid-July 1863. Both suffered severe casualties—about one third of their men. Company I's Captain Dennis Delaney was killed, and both his lieutenants severely wounded. First Lieutenant William E. Guseman died from his wounds, while Second Lieutenant Charles H. Livingstone was taken prisoner.) The brigade moved to Frederick, Maryland, where the entire division was reorganized into two brigades. Brigadier General Judson Kilpatrick was assigned command of the division, and Brigadier General Elon J. Farnsworth was assigned command of the 1st Brigade. Brigadier General George Armstrong Custer was assigned command of the 2nd brigade. As the troops moved from Frederick toward Gettysburg, Pennsylvania, the regiment in the rear was attacked by cavalry under the command of General James Ewell Brown "Jeb" Stuart. Farnsworth's 1st Brigade counter-attacked, and with the help of Custer's 2nd Brigade drove off the Confederate cavalry. The 1st West Virginia had 2 killed, 5 wounded, and 18 men taken prisoner. This June 30 battle became known as the Battle of Hanover.

=== Gettysburg ===
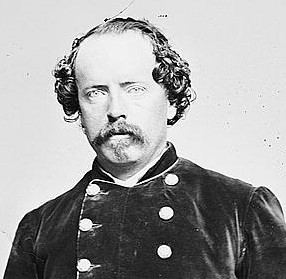
Charles E. Capehart

The Battle of Gettysburg began on the next day, lasting from July 1 through July 3. The Union Army of the Potomac, commanded by General George G. Meade, defeated the invading Confederate Army of Northern Virginia commanded by General Robert E. Lee. Over 150,000 men (both sides combined) fought in this battle, and casualties are estimated to be around 51,000.

Farnsworth's brigade did not encounter any enemy forces for the first two days (July 1 and 2) of the battle. Late in the afternoon on the third day of the battle, Kilpatrick ordered Farnsworth to make a mounted charge against a Confederate infantry position that was fortified and near ground difficult for horses. Although Farnsworth objected, he followed his orders. The 1st West Virginia Cavalry, led by Richmond, made the first charge. The West Virginians became nearly surrounded by the 1st Texas Infantry and had to retreat to safety using their sabers. They took some prisoners and suffered casualties of five killed and four wounded. Farnsworth led a second group of men in another charge and took significant casualties—and Farnsworth was killed. The charge became known as the infamous Farnsworth's Charge. After the death of Farnsworth, Richmond assumed command (officially July 4) of Farnsworth's 1st Brigade. Major Charles E. Capehart assumed command of the 1st West Virginia Cavalry. (Note: Charles Capehart was an officer in two Illinois infantry regiments before joining the 1st (West) Virginia Cavalry as a captain on July 2, 1862. He was commissioned as major of the regiment on June 6, 1863.) Both commands were temporary.

=== Pursuit of Lee's Army ===
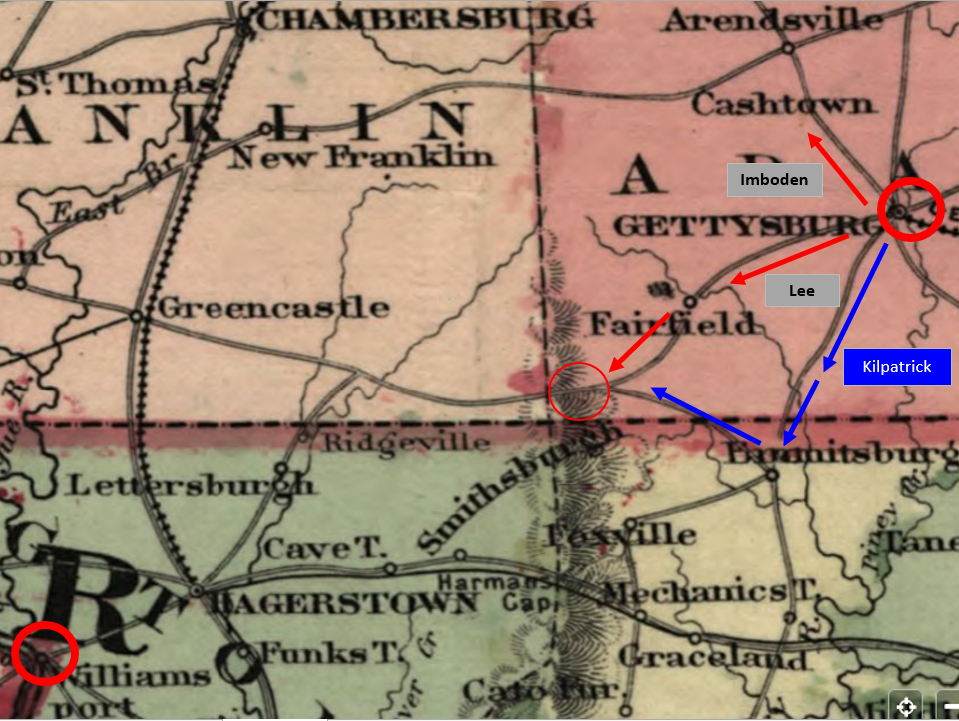
Kilpatrick's Division pursued Lee after getting reinforcements.

After the third day of fighting at Gettysburg, armies on both sides were exhausted. Lee's Confederate Army of Northern Virginia prepared to leave during the rainy night and return to the relative safety of Virginia. Their trip back would involve traveling through mountains to cross the Potomac River at Williamsport, Maryland. General John D. Imboden led a wagon train carrying wounded men on a northwest route, which was safer and easier to follow. Lee moved with the healthy part of his Army of Northern Virginia on a more southern route to Williamsport that was shorter but had more difficult terrain.

Kilpatrick's division, which was reinforced with cavalry stationed at Emmitsburg, Maryland, pursued Lee's retreating army. Late at night high in the mountains, near Monterey Pass, a dismounted advance guard company from Custer's 2nd Brigade confronted a small group of rebels guarding the pass. The rebels, using only one piece of artillery, prevented Custer's men from entering the pass while a wagon train belonging to Confederate General Richard S. Ewell moved from the north into the pass.

At 3 am, the 1st West Virginia Cavalry were ordered to assist Custer. In pouring rain and total darkness, the 1st West Virginia Cavalry charged down the mountain, capturing the Confederate artillery piece and an entire wagon train in hand-to-hand combat. (Note: One source says 640 officers and men made the charge. Another source said that less than 100 men followed through with the charge.) The captured wagon train consisted of 300 wagons and 15 ambulances, and the horses and mules pulling them. A total of 200 officers and 1,100 men were captured. Casualties for the 1st West Virginia were only 2 killed and 2 wounded. For this action, Charles Capehart was later awarded the Medal of Honor. He accomplished this while having a shattered ankle that was the result of being shot while fighting at Gettysburg.

Less than a week after the battle at Monterey Pass, Colonel Othniel De Forest (who had been ill) of the 5th New York Cavalry reported for duty, and Richmond was relieved from command of the 1st Brigade. Richmond and the 1st West Virginia Cavalry reported to Frederick, Maryland, for provost duty. Lee's army crossed the Potomac at Williamsport and Falling Waters on July 14.

== Capehart becomes commander ==
For the last half of July, the regiment fought in some minor skirmishes, and eventually reported to Stafford, Virginia, near Fredericksburg. On September 16, Richmond was injured when his horse was shot and fell on him at Raccoon Ford on the Rapidan River. He resigned in early November after an October promotion to colonel, and was discharged on a Surgeon's Certificate of Disability on November 11.

During November, the regiment (ten companies) was in the Battle of Mine Run as part of Custer's Third Division. Their brigade commander was General Henry Eugene Davies, and the regiment was under the temporary command of Major Harvey Farabee. Henry Capehart, the regiment's surgeon (and brother of Charles Capehart), was familiar with the territory, and provided valuable assistance to Davies in strategy and fighting—in addition to navigating the terrain. Davies was impressed, and along with Kilpatrick and Custer recommended Capehart to replace the injured Colonel Richmond as commander of the 1st West Virginia Cavalry. Henry Capehart was commissioned as colonel on December 23, becoming the regiment's commander.

== Army of West Virginia ==
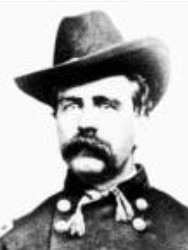
Henry Capehart

Beginning in December, the regiment became part of the Department of West Virginia, but was unassigned. Near the end of January 1864, the regiment returned to Wheeling. They stayed at Camp Willey on Wheeling Island for a few days before going to their homes for a 30-day furlough. About 500 men re-enlisted. A reception to honor the regiment was held in Wheeling on February 3. The local newspaper called them "The Heroes of 70 Engagements". The regiment left Wheeling during mid-March, departing on the B&O Railroad. They became part of the 2nd Brigade, Second Cavalry Division, in the Army of West Virginia. They patrolled West Virginia for the next six weeks, but did not see any significant action.

Beginning in May, the regiment was part of the 3rd Brigade, Second Cavalry Division. They participated in General William W. Averell's Raid on the Virginia & Tennessee Railroad, which was a valuable asset for the Confederacy because it enabled transportation of soldiers and supplies between the two states. On May 10, Averell's division (including the regiment) fought in the Battle of Cove Mountain in northern Wythe County, Virginia. Averell was eventually able to destroy 26 bridges and portions of railroad track near Dublin (Newbern on old maps), Virginia. The division returned to its base in West Virginia on May 18.

On May 22, the regiment was fording the Greenbrier River just upriver from a waterfall. Their objective was to eliminate some Confederate sharpshooters that were harassing the cavalry. Colonel Henry Capehart stationed himself between the falls and the crossing. His standard procedure was to position himself down river at crossings, which would enable him to rescue men having trouble crossing the water. He was an expert rider and had a horse that was a good swimmer. In this circumstance, a private from Company B was swept out of his saddle while attempting to cross a swollen river with a swift current. Not only was the private swept over the falls, but Capehart and his horse were too. Capehart was able to rescue the private while both were being shot at by enemy sharpshooters. On February 12, 1895, Henry Capehart was awarded the Medal of Honor for this action. His citation read "Saved, under fire, the life of a drowning soldier."

=== Hunter's Lynchburg Campaign ===
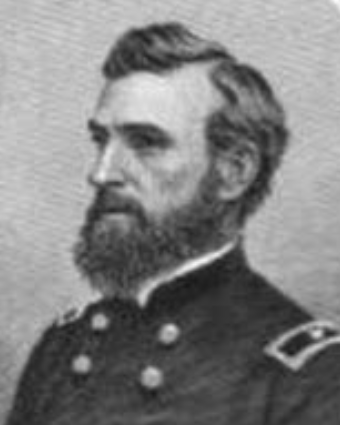
William H. Powell

During early June, various Union forces met in Stanton, Virginia, and were resupplied. After a reorganization on June 9, Averell commanded the Second Cavalry Division, and its 3rd Brigade (1st and 2nd West Virginia Cavalry regiments) was commanded by Colonel William H. Powell. The infantry was led by General George Crook. General David Hunter was the commander of the entire cavalry and infantry force. On June 10, they moved toward Lexington, Virginia as part of a plan to capture Lynchburg. The force arrived in Lexington on June 11, and occupied the town for several days. On June 14, Powell's brigade was sent forward Liberty, and drove away Confederate cavalry. During this time, Confederate reinforcements were arriving at Lynchburg.

On June 16, the entire Union force left Liberty and approached Lynchburg from the southwest. The Battle of Lynchburg was fought on June 17 and 18. Approximately 44,000 soldiers participated in this Confederate victory. The Union force could not capture Lynchburg, and was forced to retreat toward West Virginia as supplies dwindled. The force reached Charleston on July 1. Losses for Hunter's entire army totaled to 940 men.

== Shenandoah Valley ==
During July, the 1st West Virginia Cavalry left Charleston, West Virginia, for Parkersburg—where they boarded the B&O Railroad with their horses to begin a three-day trip to the other side of the state. Their destination was the rail station at Martinsburg. The regiment was commanded by Henry Capehart, and was part of the 2nd Brigade, Second Cavalry Division, Army of West Virginia. Hunter commanded this army while Averell commanded its Second Cavalry Division. Powell commanded the 2nd Brigade of the Second Division.

=== Battle of Rutherford's Farm ===
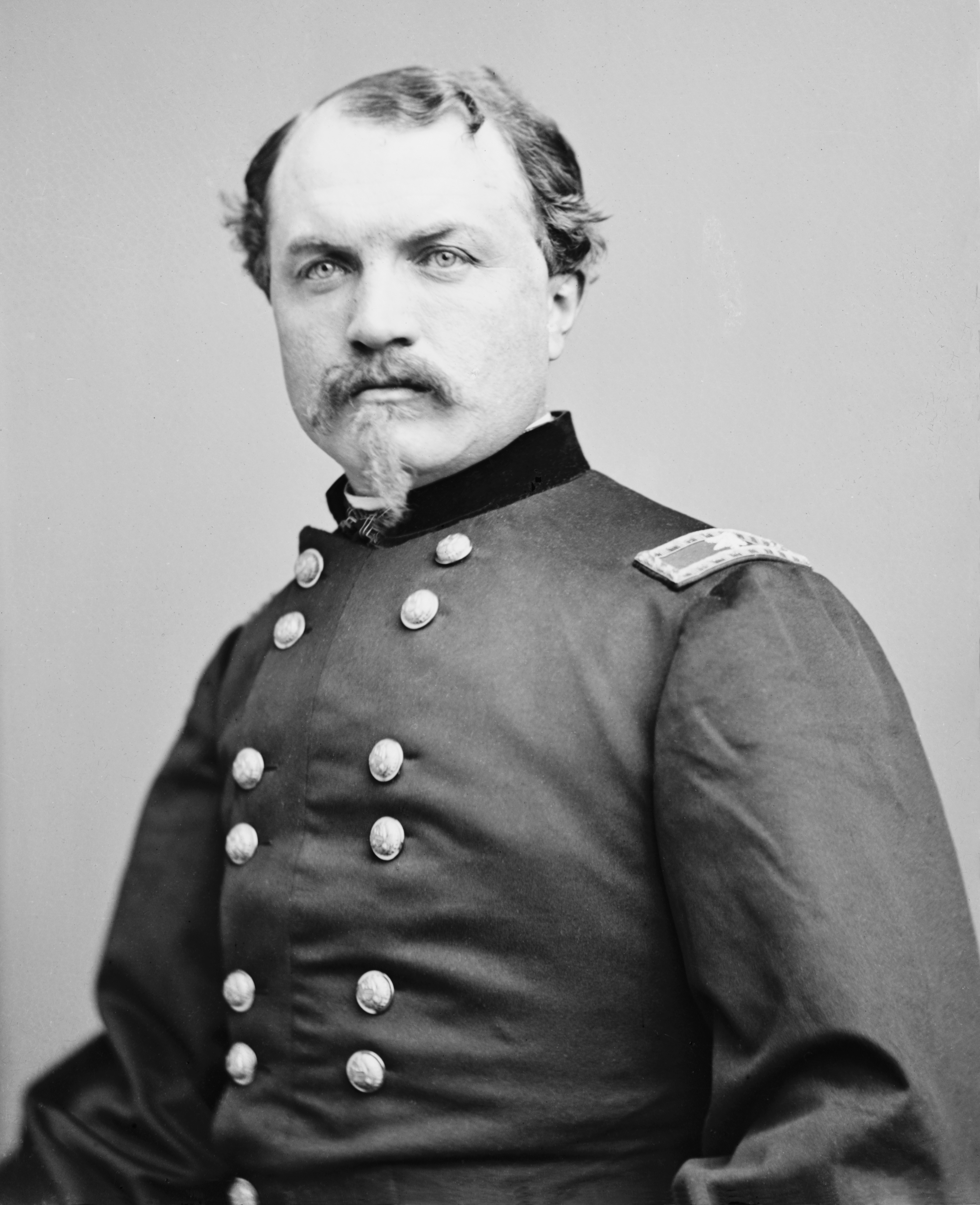
William W. Averell

The Battle of Rutherford's Farm, also known as the Battle of Carter's Farm, occurred on July 20, about 4 miles (6.4 km) north of Winchester, Virginia. While portions of Hunter's army were still arriving in the Martinsburg area, Hunter sent Averell from Martinsburg toward Winchester to meet a perceived threat to the B&O Railroad from General Jubal Early's Army of the Valley. Averell did not have his entire cavalry force when he started, but had about 1,000 men from the 1st and 3rd West Virginia Cavalry Regiments. He also had another 1,350 infantrymen. He advanced southwest down the Valley Turnpike, and was attacked by Confederate troops under the command of General Stephen Dodson Ramseur. Although the attack was initially successful, Averell was reinforced by 300 men from the 2nd West Virginia Cavalry who had arrived at Martinsburg after Averell had departed. The unexpected reinforcement led to a Confederate panic, and Averell won the battle. The Confederate loss was about 400 to 450 men, and Averell's men collected 500 rifles from the battlefield. Averell's casualties were about 220.

=== Second Battle of Kernstown ===
After Averell's victory at Rutherford's Farm, he was joined by another cavalry division and infantry. Crook commanded the entire force. Both cavalry divisions sent men on scouts to find Early's army. Crook believed that most of Early's army had left the valley to defend the Confederate capital, Richmond, Virginia. He did not believe the reports of Averell and General Alfred N. Duffié (commander of the First Cavalry Division) that said enemy infantry, artillery, and cavalry were in the area. Crook was mistaken, and both cavalry units made accurate reports.

On July 24, Averell was ordered to conduct a flanking maneuver near Front Royal to cut off what Crook believed was a small band of Confederates. Averell encountered a much larger enemy force than he was led to expect, and the Second Battle of Kernstown began. As portions of Crook's force began retreating (some in panic) north through Winchester, he finally understood the situation. He organized a more orderly retreat. (Note: One brigade commander from Duffié's First Division caused panic by ordering teamsters to bring their horses to a trot as his brigade fled north. The main road eventually became littered with burning wagons. Duffié's other brigade, led by Colonel William B. Tibbits, performed much more admirably. His brigade made several charges that enabled trapped infantry men to escape.) Powell's brigade (including the 1st West Virginia Cavalry) and an infantry brigade led by Colonel Rutherford B. Hayes (future President of the United States) were among the few organized units remaining. They became the rear guard against the pursuing Confederate cavalry. The battle was over by the end of July 25, as all soldiers were soaked in cold rain. Crook retreated north across the Potomac River, and the Confederates reoccupied Martinsburg (in addition to controlling Winchester). The 1st West Virginia Cavalry lost a total of 28 men killed, wounded, missing, or captured.

=== Chambersburg and Moorefield ===
The regiment was part of Averell's cavalry force that pursued Confederate Generals McCausland and Bradley Johnson after the rebels burned the Pennsylvania community of Chambersburg. After multiple skirmishes and Confederate threats to burn more towns, McCausland's two brigades of cavalry were caught in Battle of Moorefield, West Virginia. In a surprise attack at dawn on August 6, 1864, Averell captured over 400 Confederates. In this battle, Powell rode with Henry Capehart and the 1st West Virginia Cavalry. After the 3rd West Virginia Cavalry charged across the South Branch of the Potomac River and met strong resistance from the Confederate 17th Virginia Cavalry, they were reinforced by the 1st West Virginia—and the two regiments overwhelmed the Confederates. Powell's report said "The thanks of the brigade are also due to the First West Virginia Cavalry for the timely support given to the Third West Virginia Cavalry at a time when the enemy seemed conscious of our weakness, and attempted to rally their forces and to repel the advance of our lines, and for its joint operation with the Third Virginia Cavalry, driving the enemy into the mountains for a distance of twelve miles, killing, wounding and capturing many, also capturing one battle-flag and two pieces of artillery." Despite Averell's successes, General Philip H. Sheridan assumed command of all Union troops in the Shenandoah Valley on August 7.

=== Battle of Opequon ===
The Battle of Opequon, also known as the Third Battle of Winchester, began in the morning on September 19, 1864. Some historians consider this the most important battle of the Shenandoah Campaign. Sheridan's Army of the Shenandoah defeated Early's Army of the Valley. Union casualties were about 5,000 out of 40,000 men, while Confederate casualties were about 3,600 out of 12,000 men. Generals and colonels on both sides were killed, including Confederate Colonel George S. Patton Sr.—grandfather of the famous World War II tank commander, General George S. Patton. Confederate General Robert E. Rodes was killed, and Confederate cavalry generals Fitzhugh Lee and Bradley Johnson were among the wounded. General David Allen Russell, killed in action, was among the Union casualties. The majority of the Union casualties were in the infantry. Averell's Second Cavalry Division had only 35 casualties, including four from the 1st West Virginia Cavalry.

=== Battle of Fisher's Hill ===
The Battle of Fisher's Hill occurred on September 21–22, 1864. Early's Confederate army was pursued from Winchester to Fisher's Hill, where the rebels had strong fortifications and an advantageous location given the terrain. The 1st West Virginia Cavalry was part of a diversion that enabled Crook's infantry to secretly position itself to the rear of the Confederate line. Crook's surprise attack broke through the Confederate lines, and was the major reason for the Union victory. The 1st West Virginia Cavalry was part of Powell's cavalry brigade that pushed through the gap created by Crook, and chased rebels as they fled south.

After the battle, Sheridan pressured his officers to pursue Early's retreating army. Sheridan became impatient with Averell, who he considered too cautious. On September 23, Sheridan replaced Averell with Powell. Henry Capehart was designated commander of Powell's old brigade, and Capehart's brother, Charles, became commander of the 1st West Virginia Cavalry Regiment. Powell's Second Cavalry Division pursued Early further south.

=== Battle of Cedar Creek ===
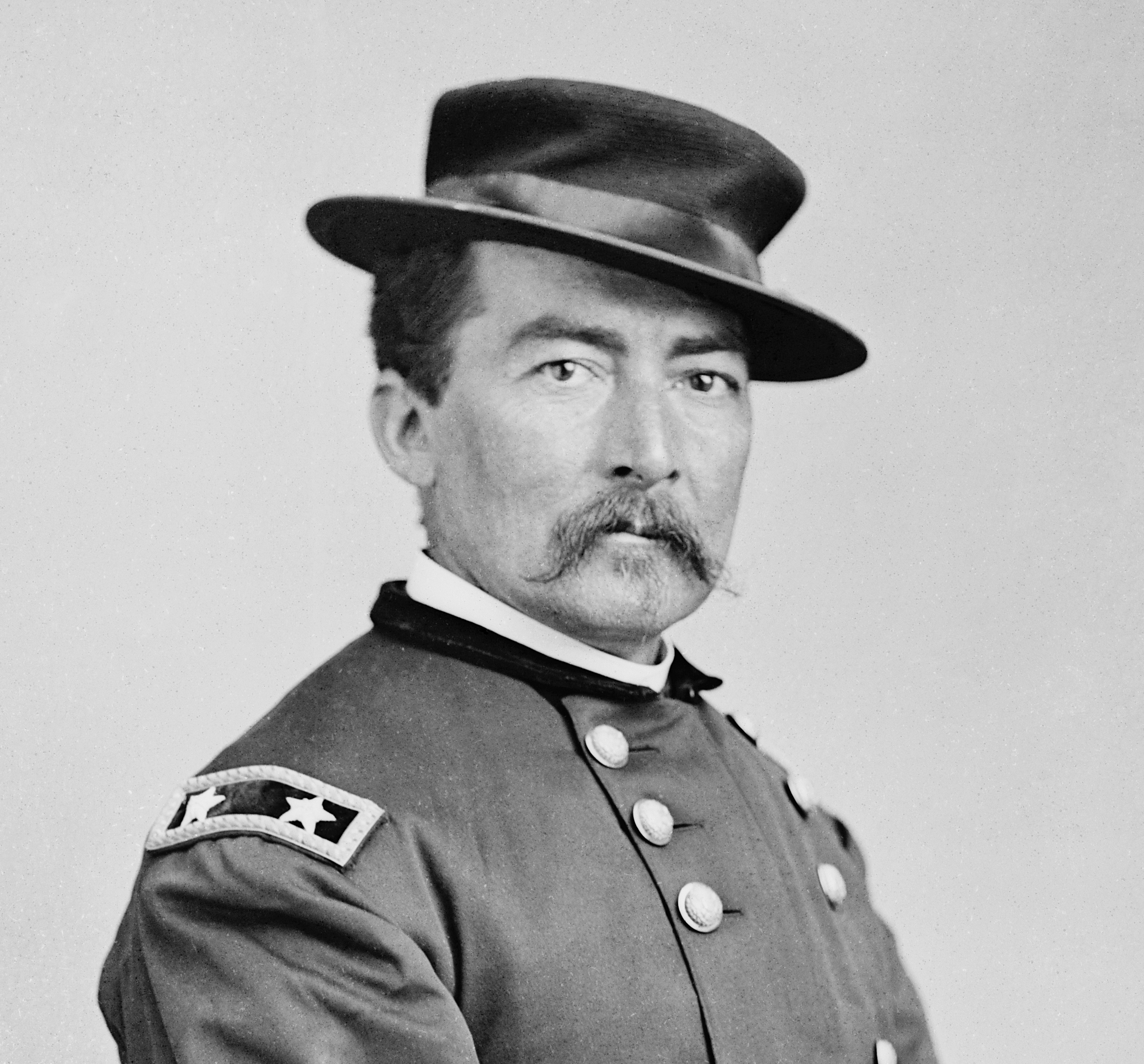
Philip Sheridan

The Battle of Cedar Creek occurred on October 19, 1864. Early's Confederate Army appeared to have a victory until Sheridan rallied his troops to a successful counterattack. Although Union casualties were more than double those of the Confederates, this battle is considered a Union victory, and Confederate troops were driven from the battlefield. The Union troops recaptured all of their artillery lost earlier in the battle, and 22 additional cannons belonging to Early's army. Union cavalry were commanded by General Alfred Torbert. The 1st West Virginia Cavalry Regiment remained in the 2nd Brigade of Powell's Second Division. Powell positioned his division near Front Royal to prevent Confederate cavalry under General Lunsford L. Lomax from flanking the Union force. The 1st West Virginia Cavalry had a total of 3 casualties in this battle.

=== Nineveh ===
On November 12, the Second Division again fought Lomax's cavalry. Powell sent most of his 1st Brigade out beyond Front Royal, where it encountered a portion of Lomax's cavalry commanded by McCausland. The Confederates slowly pushed the 1st Brigade back. Powell brought Capehart's 2nd Brigade, including the 1st West Virginia Cavalry, to the front while the 1st Brigade moved to the rear. (Note: Powell's 1st Brigade consisted of the 8th Ohio Cavalry, 14th Pennsylvania Cavalry, and 21st New York Cavalry regiments. His 2nd Brigade consisted of the 1st West Virginia Cavalry, 3rd West Virginia Cavalry, and 1st New York Cavalry.) Capehart's brigade charged, resulting in a short clash that ended with the Confederates retreating as fast as they could. They were chased for 8 miles (12.9 km). Powell captured all of the rebel artillery (two guns), their ammunition train, and took 180 prisoners. Newspaper accounts said McCausland was slightly wounded. Two men from the 1st West Virginia Cavalry were awarded the Medal of Honor for actions in this battle. Private James F. Adams, from Company D, received his medal for "Capture of State flag of 14th Virginia Cavalry (C.S.A.)". The other medal winner was Sergeant Levi Shoemaker from Company A. His citation is "Capture of flag of 22d Virginia Cavalry (C.S.A.)". The Nineveh action, plus actions at Newtown or Middletown and Cedar Creek fought by other Union cavalry divisions on the same day, totaled to 184 Union casualties (killed, wounded or missing). (Note: Dyer does not list Confederate casualties in his Compendium. Powell's November 17 report listed enemy losses of 20 killed, 25 wounded, and 161 prisoners. His own loss was listed as 2 killed and 15 wounded.)

== Third Division ==
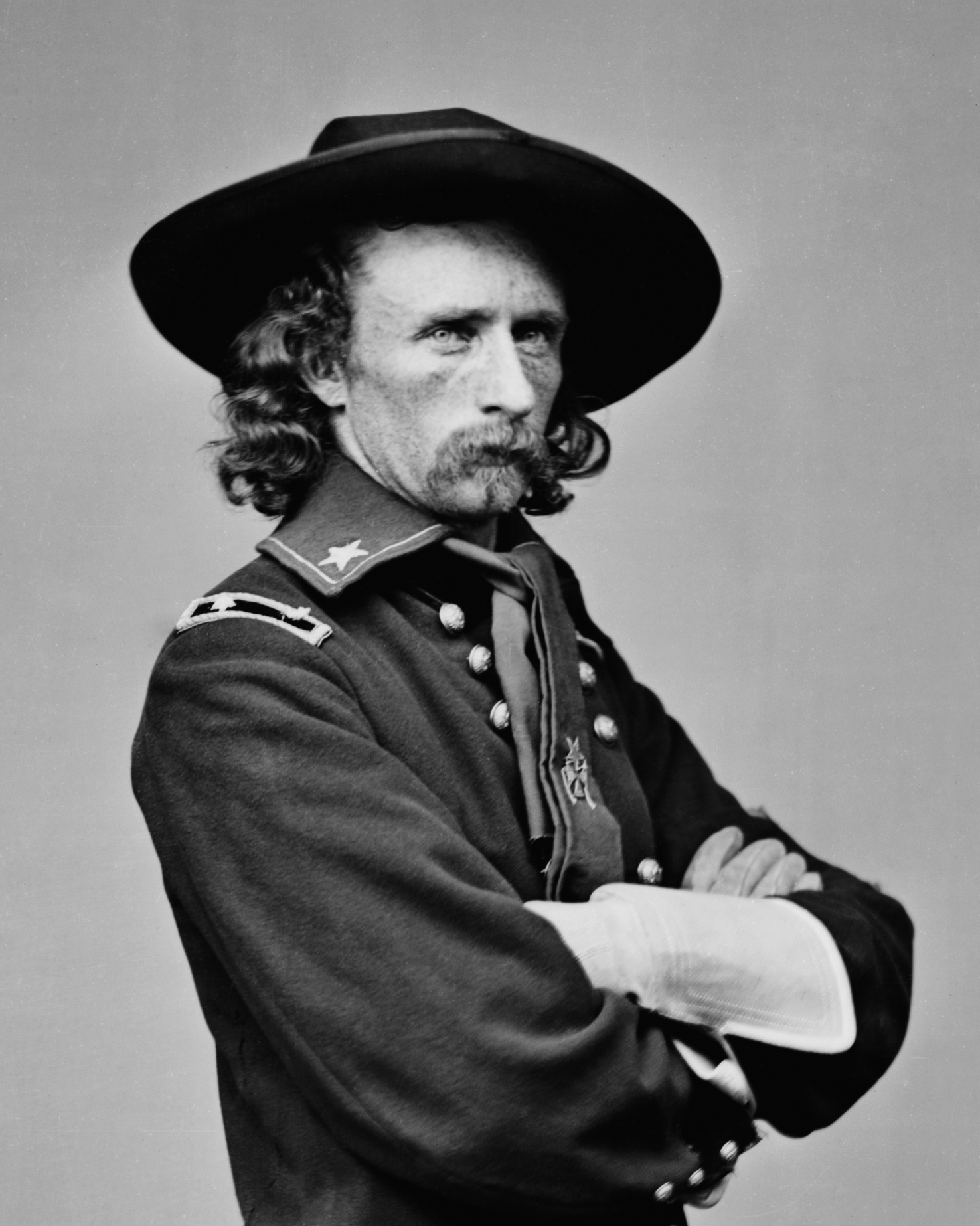
George A. Custer

Powell resigned from the Union Army on January 5, 1865. His father had died and his mother was seriously ill. Sheridan reorganized his 8,000-man force into two cavalry divisions. General Wesley Merritt was Sheridan's cavalry commander. General Thomas Devin led the First Division, and Custer commanded the Third Division. There was no Second Division. The 1st West Virginia Cavalry became part of the 3rd Brigade, Third Division Cavalry Corps. The brigade consisted of the 1st, 2nd, and 3rd West Virginia Cavalry Regiments, and the 1st Regiment New York (Lincoln) Cavalry, and was commanded by Henry Capehart. These four regiments had been most of Averell's force that had a major victory at Moorefield during August 1864. As a brigade, they had also performed extremely well three months later at Nineveh under Powell's command. The brigade became known as Capehart's Fighting Brigade, after its skills were noticed by Sheridan—who called it "the fighting brigade". Both divisions spent about six weeks in winter quarters, where they rested and were given fresh clothing. On February 27, they left Winchester and moved south. Their purpose was to eliminate Early's Army of the Valley.

=== Laurel Brigade ===
In late February, Early received additional troops which were supposed to enable him to attack instead of flee. The reinforcement was the elite Confederate cavalry known as the Laurel Brigade, and it was under the command of General Thomas L. Rosser. Many of the men in the proud and well–equipped Laurel Brigade had served with Stuart—the Confederacy's most famous cavalry officer. (Note: Jeb Stuart was one of the Confederacy's most famous leaders. One historian wrote "Few Confederate generals achieved wider renown during the Civil War than Major General James Ewell Brown Stuart." He was killed in battle during mid-May 1864.) Early added his own cavalry to Rosser's command, and sent them toward Custer's approaching division. Rosser used rails to fill a covered bridge over the middle fork of the Shenandoah River, and this is where he planned to confront Custer.

At 2:00 am, on March 1, Capehart's brigade was awakened and told to prepare to move without breakfast or feed for their horses. Their objective was to remove the obstacle of Rosser's cavalry, which would enable the rest of Custer's division to attack Early's army—which was thought to be between Harrisonburg and Staunton. At the covered bridge, Capehart sent a portion of his brigade, dismounted, to attack Rosser. The 1st West Virginia Cavalry was sent upriver where it crossed and then charged down on Rosser. (Note: A member of the 2nd West Virginia Cavalry wrote that Capehart (the brigade's commander) sent the 1st West Virginia upriver. A member of the 1st New York Cavalry wrote that Custer (the division commander) sent the 1st New York Cavalry, supported by the 1st West Virginia Cavalry, upriver.) The brigade drove off Rosser's cavalry, capturing 50 men and all of his artillery. Thus Custer, utilizing Capehart's brigade (including the 1st West Virginia Cavalry), defeated one of the Confederacy's best cavalries.

=== Battle of Waynesboro ===
Sheridan's cavalry encountered the remnants of Early's army at Waynesboro, Virginia, on March 2. Most of Early's army was killed or captured, although Early evaded capture. Custer's division did the fighting. His 1st Brigade dismounted and attacked as infantry, then Capehart's 3rd Brigade, including the 1st West Virginia Cavalry, charged and cut off over half of Early's force—which forced that portion of the rebels to surrender. All of Early's headquarters equipment was captured, as were 11 pieces of artillery. Capehart's brigade chased the fleeing rebels toward Rockfish Gap. A New York newspaper credited the 3rd Brigade with capturing 5 pieces of artillery, 67 wagons of ammunition and food, and 1 battle flag. Early's army was eliminated from the war.

== Sheridan leaves the Valley to fight Lee's army ==
Sheridan's original orders were to destroy the Virginia Central Railroad and then meet with the army of Union General William Tecumseh Sherman in North Carolina. Sheridan reached Charlottesville on March 3, but faced delays caused by muddy roads. On March 5, Sergeant Richard Boury, from Company C, was part of a squadron of the 1st West Virginia Cavalry sent into the mountains to find some rebels that had retreated from Waynesboro. Boury captured a flag and three rebels. He received the Medal of Honor, and the citation described his action as being "at Charlottesville" .

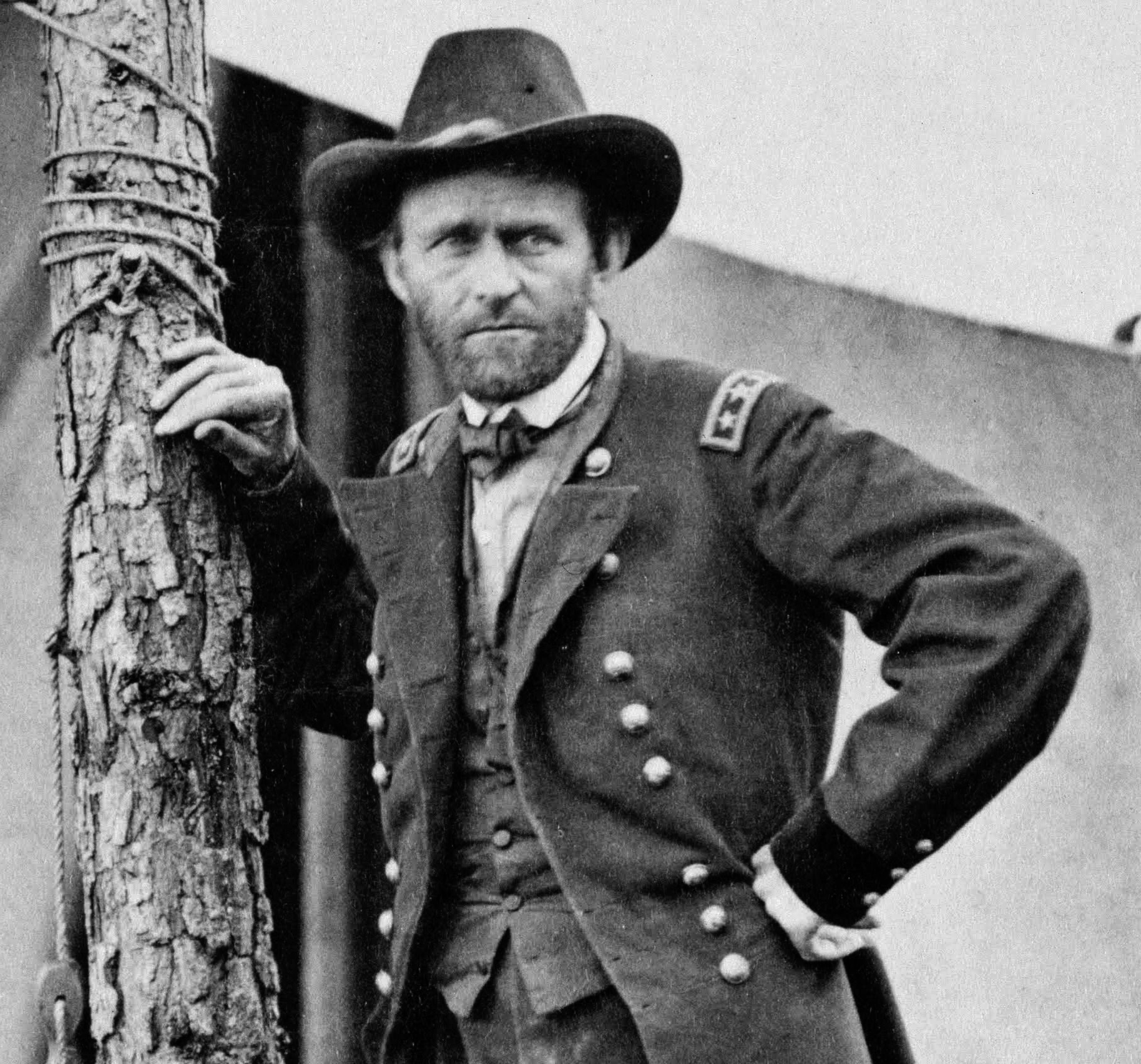
U.S. Grant 1864

Rainy weather, swollen rivers, and destroyed bridges persuaded Sheridan to move east toward Richmond instead of moving south across the river to link with Sherman's army in North Carolina. Private Archibald H. Rowand, Jr., of the 1st West Virginia Cavalry's Company K, was one of two men sent with a message from Sheridan to General Ulysses S. Grant (the Union's highest-ranking officer and future president of the United States). His mission meant that he had to get through Confederate lines. To accomplish this feat, Rowand wore a Confederate uniform for much of his journey. His 48-hour journey covered 145 mi (233.4 km) on horseback and an additional 11 mi (17.7 km) on foot. Near the end of his journey, he was chased by Confederates and had to abandon his horse and swim the Chickahominy River. That started the walking portion of his journey. He was wet, muddy, and was wearing only his underclothing when he crossed into Union lines. (Note: Rowand's adventure was discussed in a Pittsburg newspaper article in 1998.)

Sheridan's two divisions reached a Union Army base at the river port community of White House, Virginia, on March 18, 1865. At White House, the two divisions were resupplied, and rested for five days. They departed on March 24, and met the Army of the Potomac near Petersburg on March 27. The Army of the Potomac was "the Union's primary army operating in the East." Sheridan's Army of the Shenandoah was still considered separate from the Army of the Potomac, so he received orders directly from Grant. Grant was working on site with Meade and the Army of the Potomac. Meade had partially surrounded Lee's army at Richmond and Petersburg, but Lee still had a western escape route. Grant ordered Sheridan to proceed to Dinwiddie, Virginia, where it could cut off Lee's escape route. The two divisions were joined by the Second Cavalry Division from the Army of the Potomac, which was led by General Crook. The three cavalry divisions totaled to a force of about 9,000.

=== Battle of Dinwiddie Court House ===
Sheridan now had three divisions, and reached Dinwiddie Court House on March 29. While most of his army went into camp at that location, Custer's Third Division (which included the 1st West Virginia Cavalry) guarded the wagon trains further back at Malone's Crossing. On the next day, Devin's First Cavalry Division, and a brigade from Crook's Second Division, were sent north toward Five Forks. Their reconnaissance found a strong enemy infantry force led by General George E. Pickett, and the Union cavalry was driven back. The Battle of Dinwiddie Court House occurred on March 31, and is considered a Confederate victory. While Sheridan again sent Devin and Crook north, Pickett's infantry and cavalry led by Major General Fitzhugh Lee drove back infantry under the command of Union General Gouverneur Kemble Warren, located east of Sheridan's army. Then the attacking Confederate force turned its attention to Sheridan. This forced Sheridan's cavalry to face three enemy divisions: two infantries and one cavalry. As the Union cavalry was driven back toward Dinwiddie Court House, Capehart's 3rd Brigade was recalled from duty guarding the wagon train. They moved near what would soon become the front, an open area in front of Dinwiddie. Capehart's brigade used rails from a fence to quickly build a protective area for fighting while dismounted. The brigade was able to halt the Confederate attack in fighting that continued until after dark.

=== Battle of Five Forks ===
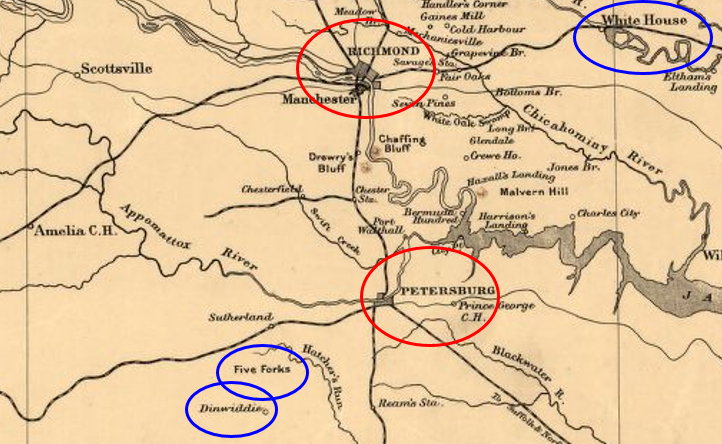
Sheridan's cavalry movement near Richmond and Petersburg

The Battle of Five Forks occurred on April 1, 1865. Five Forks is a small community in Dinwiddie County, located between Dinwiddie Court House and Petersburg. Sheridan received reinforcements from the Fifth Corps and a division of cavalry from the Army of the James. The Confederate force was again led by Pickett and Fitzhugh Lee. Both sides advanced and retreated, and soon the opposing forces were fighting in close combat using sabers. At times, the cavalry fought dismounted. A portion of Capehart's brigade drove the rebels to the end of the field, only to be partially driven back by a second group of Confederate cavalrymen. After the regiment was reinforced by the rest of Capehart's brigade, the Confederates were driven from the area, and numerous battle flags were captured.

Lieutenant Wilmon W. Blackmar, from Company H of the 1st West Virginia Cavalry, was awarded the Medal of Honor for extraordinary heroism in this battle. After Capehart's brigade began a charge, Blackmar observed that they were chasing a small detachment of Confederates, and the main body of the Confederates was about to isolate the cavalry from the Union infantry. Blackmar caught up with Capehart and informed him of the situation, and was ordered to reform the brigade in the correct line of battle. Blackmar reformed a portion of the brigade and led a charge without waiting for the rest of the brigade. The charging men took prisoners, and captured artillery, wagons, and ambulances. Custer and Capehart promoted Blackmar to captain immediately. Blackmar's Medal of Honor citation says "At a critical stage of the battle, without orders, led a successful advance upon the enemy."

Although the battle is considered finished on the day it started, skirmishing continued as Lee's army tried to escape to the west. On April 2, Capehart's brigade attacked the Confederates at Namozine Church. In this confrontation, Henry Capehart's horse was killed, and his clothing was pierced with several shots that did not seriously wound him. On the next day, another brigade from Custer's division attacked, and eventually the Confederates escaped toward Amelia Court House. This inconclusive battle, described as a Confederate rear guard action, became known as the Battle of Namozine Church. Total casualties for both sides are an estimated 75, and Confederate General Rufus Barringer was captured.

=== Battle of Sailor's Creek ===
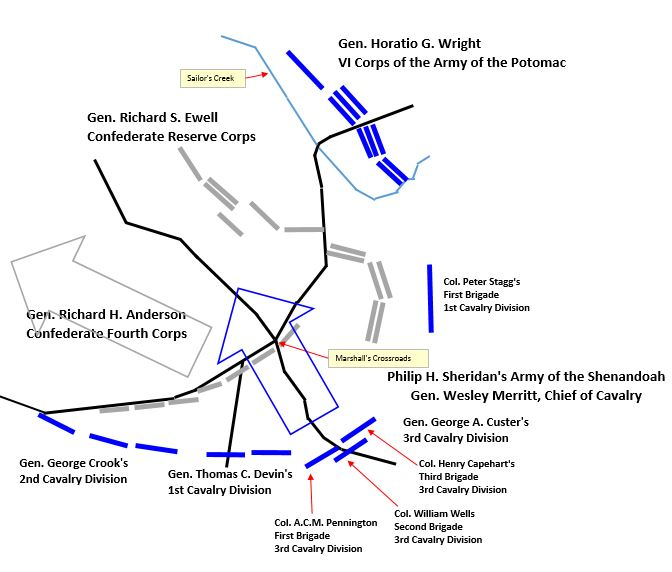
A push by Capehart's Brigade of Custer's Division helped surround Ewell's Reserve Corps in the Marshall's Crossroads area of the Battle of Sailor's Creek

In early April, the Confederate government abandoned Richmond, and Lee's army began moving west. On April 6, Union troops chased Lee's army to an area south of the Appomattox River near Saylor's Creek. (Note: The creek and the battle, as found on old maps, are spelled multiple ways: Sailors', Sailer's, Saylor's, and Sayler's. The National Park Service uses the spelling Sailor's Creek. The historic name is Sayler's Creek.) The Battle of Sailor's Creek was concentrated in three places, and Sheridan's cavalry fought in the Marshall's Crossroads area. Sergeant Francis M. Cunningham, from Company H of the 1st West Virginia Cavalry, wrote that the battle "was one of the hardest cavalry fights of the war." Custer's cavalry division made numerous charges upon the Confederate lines. Although the charges were successful in capturing artillery and men, casualties were high. Armies on both sides had already suffered numerous casualties in battles at Dinwiddie Court House and Five Forks. In the case of Company H, only four men remained for the final charge.

As Henry Capehart, commander of Custer's 3rd Brigade, reviewed the Confederate army's position, Custer rode along the lines in plain view of the Confederate infantry, taunting his enemy with captured Confederate battle flags. The Confederates responded by taking numerous shots at the general, hitting his horse. Custer dismounted without injury. Capehart realized that the Confederates would need time to reload their single-shot rifles, and requested permission for his 3rd Brigade to attack immediately. Custer quickly agreed, and Capehart's brigade of about 1,400 cavalry men including the 1st West Virginia Cavalry charged the Confederate lines.

Capehart's men used sabers, carbines, and revolvers to move through three Confederate infantry lines. A large portion of Ewell's corps became surrounded, causing many of the demoralized Confederate soldiers to surrender. Thus, the Union troops captured more than 20 percent of Lee's army. Approximately 8,000 Confederate soldiers, including eight generals, were killed or captured. Among the surrendering generals was the corps commander Ewell. Another general captured was Custis Lee, eldest son of the commander of the Army of Northern Virginia, Robert E. Lee. Upon seeing the battered survivors from his army, Robert E. Lee said "My God, has the army dissolved?" Although many men from General Richard H. Anderson's IV Corps escaped westward, the battle is considered the "death knell" for Lee's Confederate Army. The Battle of Sailor's Creek was the last major battle of the American Civil War.

Five men from the 1st West Virginia Cavalry were awarded the Medal of Honor for actions in this battle. Captain Hugh P. Boon received his medal for capturing a flag. Boon's Company B was part of a charge when he noticed a battalion of enemy infantry on the right. He led his company away from the original charge, moving toward the infantry. His company routed the Confederate battalion, and Boon captured the flag of the 10th Georgia Infantry. Although Boon was worried that he did not exactly follow orders, a superior officer witnessed the affair and acknowledged that the captain took appropriate action. Sergeant Francis M. Cunningham's Medal of Honor citation reads "Capture of battle flag of 12th Virginia Infantry (C.S.A.) in hand-to-hand battle while wounded." Cunningham's horse had been killed, but he found a Confederate mule that leaped a Confederate breastworks when the regiment made a charge. Although Cunningham, who was from Company H, was shot twice (but survived), he captured a Confederate flag using his saber. Custer later recommended Cunningham for the award. Commissary Sergeant William Houlton won his medal for the capture of a flag, but the regiment was not identified in the citation. Corporal Emisire Shahan from Company A received his medal for "Capture of flag of 76th Georgia Infantry (C.S.A.)". The citation for Medal of Honor winner Private Daniel A. Woods, who was from Company K, says "Capture of flag of 18th Florida Infantry (C.S.A.)".

=== Battle of Appomattox Station ===
On April 8, Lee's Army of Northern Virginia continued to flee westward. Two Union army corps were following. Additional Union troops, including Sheridan's cavalry, were further west. Sheridan hoped to block Lee's retreat. His advance force was Custer's Third Division. Custer captured Confederate supply trains and removed a few pieces of track to prevent the trains from going back to Lynchburg. However, Custer was then repelled by Confederate artillery. After two more attacks using single brigades were ineffective, Custer made a rare night attack using his entire division. Strong moonlight reduced the risk of getting lost or misidentifying friendly and enemy soldiers, and the night attack was successful. Custer's division captured 24 to 30 artillery pieces, 1,000 prisoners, and 150 to 200 wagons.

Two men from the 1st West Virginia Cavalry were awarded the Medal of Honor for actions in this battle. Corporal Thomas Anderson, from Company I, received his medal for capturing a Confederate flag. The flag has been, at times, displayed in Lee Chapel and Museum of Washington and Lee University. (Note: The Lee Chapel and Museum at Washington and Lee University in Lexington, Virginia, has displayed various flags from the American Civil War. Among those flags, identified as Battle Flag no. 356, is the Confederate flag captured by Corporal Thomas Anderson of the 1st West Virginia Cavalry.) Charles Schorn, Chief Bugler from Company M, also received the Medal of Honor for actions in this battle after he captured the flag of the Sumter Flying Artillery. This flag, which had been carried by the Sumpter Flying Artillery since 1861, was captured in Custer's final nighttime charge.

=== Battle of Appomattox Courthouse ===
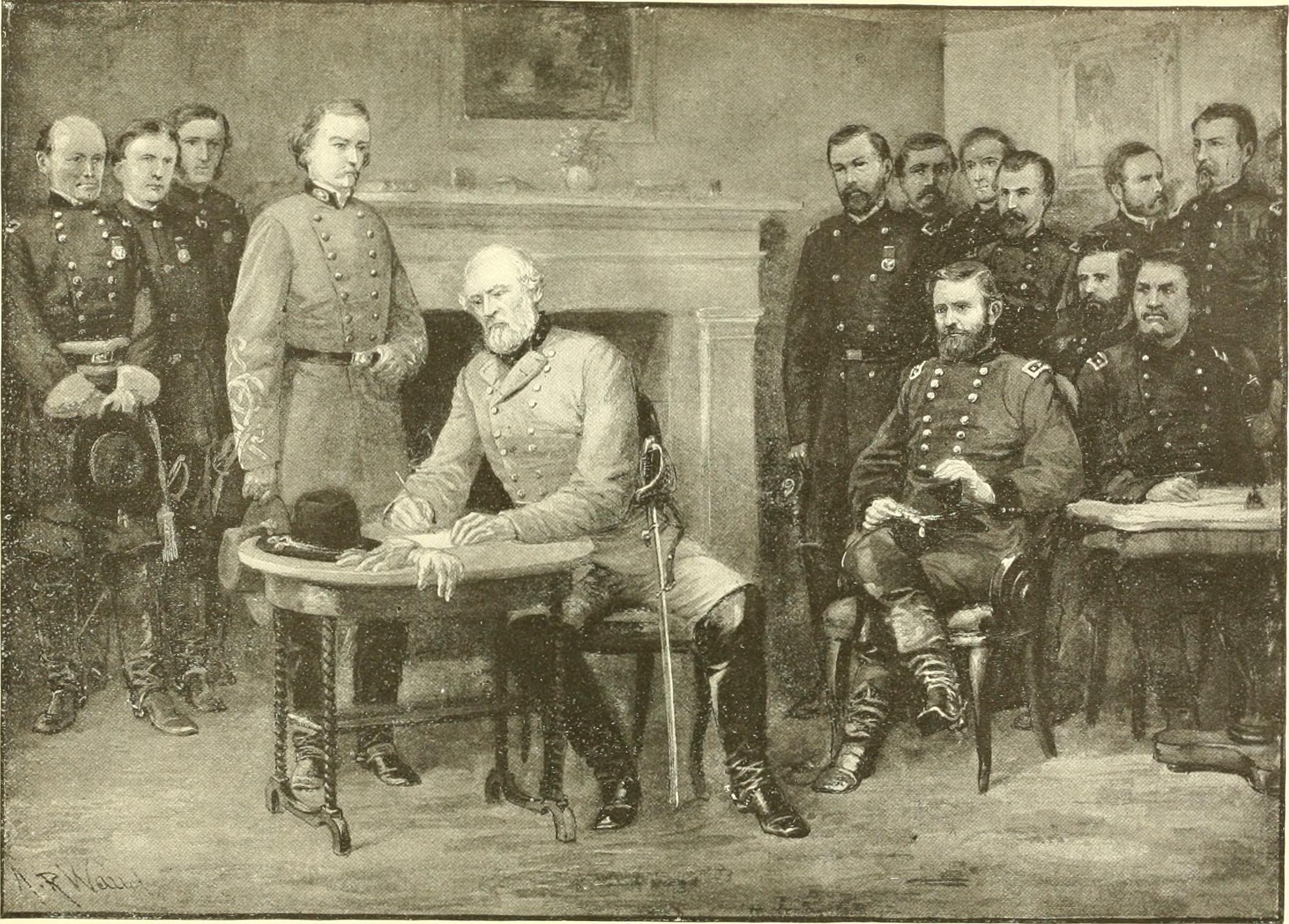
Lee surrenders to Grant

On April 9, Lee's Army of Northern Virginia continued to flee westward. Infantry led by Generals John Brown Gordon and James Longstreet, and cavalry led by Fitzhugh Lee formed a battle line near the Appomattox Court House. This was their last chance to escape to Lynchburg, as Union troops were attempting to surround them. The 1st West Virginia Cavalry's participation in this "battle" was mostly preparing to attack—but no full-fledged charges were made.

A Confederate officer approached Capehart's 3rd Brigade on horseback under a flag of truce. Capehart and the officer rode down the column to Custer, where the officer told the general that Lee and Grant were in correspondence concerning a surrender of Lee's Army. (Note: One author (Lang) says the Confederate approached General Henry Capehart. A second author (Sutton) says the Confederate officer approached "Colonel Briggs, of the seventh Michigan".) Shortly after his meeting with Longstreet's representative, Custer turned command of the division over to Henry Capehart and rode off to see Sheridan. On that day, Robert E. Lee unconditionally surrendered his starving Army of Northern Virginia to Grant. The surrender look place at the home of Wilmer and Virginia McLean in the small community of Appomattox Court House, Virginia.

== War's end ==
The 1st West Virginia Volunteer Cavalry remained in battle line until the evening of April 9, and then went into camp. On the next day, they marched toward Burkesville Junction, arriving on April 12. After resting for the night, they marched to Nottoway Court House, and received new clothing. The cavalry reached Petersburg, Virginia, by April 18, and camped outside the city. On the same day, Custer sent a recommendation to Secretary of War Stanton that Colonel Henry Capehart be promoted to Brigadier General, retroactive to March 1. (Note: Capehart's retroactive promotion can cause confusion. Custer's April 18 recommendation was a promotion retroactive to March 1. This meant that during battles such as Five Forks and Sailor's Creek, Capehart was a colonel, but after April he was considered a general since before those and several other battles. Capehart was breveted to brigadier general effective March 13.) On April 24, the division started a march to North Carolina to join Sherman's army confronting the Confederate army of General Joseph E. Johnston. However, on April 28, they became aware that Johnston had surrendered. On the next day, the division began its return north.

=== Grand Review of the armies ===
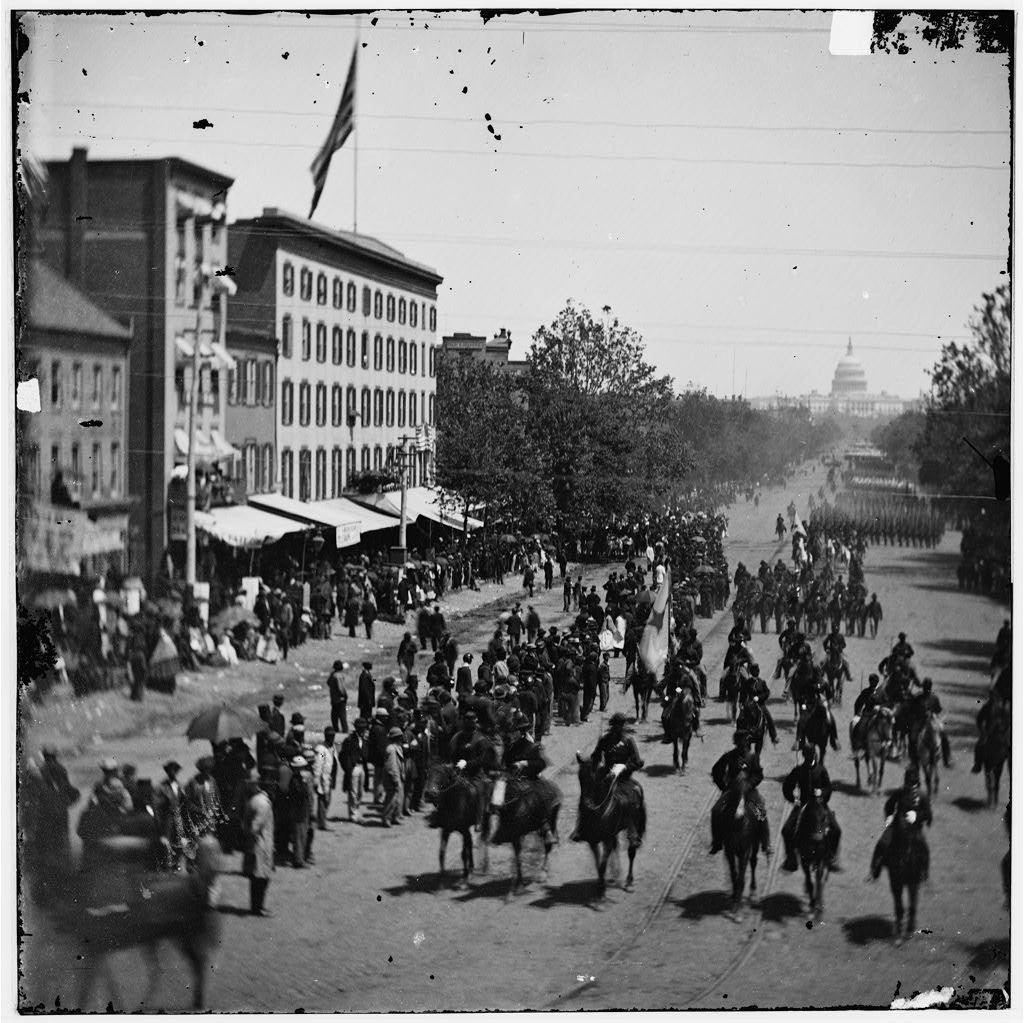
Unknown cavalry in Grand Review of the Armies

The Grand Review of the Armies began on May 23, 1865, as a Union celebration of the end of the Civil War. Union troops paraded down Pennsylvania Avenue in Washington, DC. The parade was led by Custer's Third Division, which was led by Capehart's brigade. The New York Times described men in Custer's division as "being decorated with a scarf or tie, known as the Custer Tie, red in color ..." It also said "Capehart's brigade of West Virginia Veterans, as trusty a body as ever drew a sabre, are singled out for their fine appearance ..."

=== Final muster out ===
In early June 1865, the 1st, 2nd, and 3rd West Virginia Cavalries were ordered to proceed to Wheeling, West Virginia, to muster out. On June 17, the men and their horses were loaded onto a B&O Railroad train where they departed for Wheeling. The three regiments camped on Wheeling Island between Wheeling and Belmont County, Ohio. They were officially mustered out on July 8, 1865. While Crook and Custer would continue service with the federal cavalry in the western United States, the 1st West Virginia Volunteer Cavalry Regiment ceased to exist. During the war, the regiment had 10 officers and 71 enlisted men killed. An additional 126 men died from disease. At the end of the war, the regiment was part of the highly regarded Capehart's Fighting Brigade, and was one of the most active, and most effective, of the West Virginia regiments. Fourteen men received the Medal of Honor, the most for any West Virginia regiment. (Note: The George Tyler Moore Center for the Study of the Civil War has the count of Medal of Honor winners for the 1st West Virginia Cavalry as 14. A 15th soldier is sometimes listed as a Medal of Honor winner for the regiment. However, Sergeant James M. Burns, who was in the 1st West Virginia Cavalry, was fighting with the 1st West Virginia Infantry regiment when his actions caused him to be awarded the Medal of Honor.)

== See also ==
- Medals of Honor for West Virginia Soldiers
- West Virginia Units in the Civil War
- West Virginia in the Civil War

== Notes ==
=== References ===
- Ainsworth, Fred C.; Kirkley, Joseph W. (1902). The War of the Rebellion : A Compilation of the Official Records of the Union and Confederate Armies, Series I - Volume XLIII. Washington: Government Printing Office. OCLC 427057.
- Beach, William Harrison (1902). The First New York (Lincoln) Cavalry from April 19, 1861, to July 7, 1865. New York: Lincoln Cavalry Association. p. 448. OCLC 44089779. "Nineveh Powell chased."
- Beyer, Walter F.; Keydel, Oscar F. (1907). Deeds of Valor : from Records in the Archives of the United States Government; How American Heroes Won the Medal of Honor; History of our Recent Wars and Explorations, from Personal Reminiscences and Records of Officers and Enlisted Men who were Rewarded by Congress for Most Conspicuous Acts of Bravery on the Battle-field, on the High Seas and in Arctic Explorations Volume I. Detroit: Perrien-Keydel Co. OCLC 3898179.
- Black, Robert W. (2008). Ghost, Thunderbolt, and Wizard: Mosby, Morgan, and Forrest in the Civil War. Mechanicsburg, PA: Stackpole Books. OCLC 681219923.
- Brown, Kent Masterson (2005). Retreat from Gettysburg: Lee, Logistics, and the Pennsylvania Campaign. Chapel Hill: University of North Carolina Press. ISBN 978-0-80786-942-0. OCLC 712044679.
- Dyer, Frederick H. (1908). A Compendium of the War of the Rebellion. Des Moines, Iowa: Dyer Pub. Co. OCLC 1028851810.
- Ellis, Franklin (1882). History of Fayette County, Pennsylvania: with Biographical Sketches of Many of its Pioneers and Prominent Men. Philadelphia: L. H. Everts and Co. OCLC 18032598.
- Farrar, Samuel Clarke (1911). The Twenty-second Pennsylvania Cavalry and the Ringgold Battalion, 1861–1865. Akron, Ohio & Pittsburgh: New Wemer Co. OCLC 1211514.
- Frothingham, John B. (1862). Sketch of the life of Brigadier General B. F. Kelley ... Boston: L. Prang & Co. OCLC 13098101.
- Hunt, Roger D. (2014). Colonels in Blue : Indiana, Kentucky and Tennessee : a Civil War Biographical Dictionary. Jefferson, North Carolina: McFarland & Company, Inc. ISBN 978-1-47661-386-4. OCLC 863157239.
- Johnson, Robert Underwood; Buel, Clarence Clough (1884). Battles and Leaders of the Civil War, Volume III. New York: The Century Company. OCLC 2048818.
- Lang, Theodore F. (1895). Loyal West Virginia from 1861 to 1865 : With an Introductory Chapter on the Status of Virginia for Thirty Years Prior to the War. Baltimore, MD: Deutsch Publishing Co. OCLC 779093.
- Livingston, Joel Thomas (1912). A History of Jasper County, Missouri, and its People. Chicago: Lewis Publishing Co. OCLC 2704614.
- Marcovitz, Hal (2002). George Custer. Philadelphia: Chelsea House Publishers. ISBN 978-1-43810-263-4. OCLC 233792501.
- Moore, Frank (1864). The Rebellion Record: A Diary of American Events – Third Volume. New York: G. P. Putnam. OCLC 228717409.
- O'Neill, Robert F. (2012). Chasing Jeb Stuart and John Mosby : the Union Cavalry in Northern Virginia from Second Manassas to Gettysburg. Jefferson, North Carolina: McFarland & Co. ISBN 978-0-78649-256-5. OCLC 794664336.
- Patchan, Scott C. (2007). Shenandoah Summer: The 1864 Valley Campaign. Lincoln, NE: University of Nebraska Press. ISBN 978-0-8032-0700-4. OCLC 122563754.
- Pond, George E. (1912). The Shenandoah Valley in 1864. New York: Charles Scribner's Sons. OCLC 13500039.
- Reid, Whitelaw (1868). Ohio in the War: Her Statesmen, Her Generals and Soldiers. Volume I: History of the State During the War, and the Lives of Her Generals. New York: Moore, Wilstach & Baldwin. OCLC 444862.
- Rhodes, Charles D. (1900). History of the Cavalry of the Army of the Potomac including that of the Army of Virginia (Pope's) and also the History of the Operations of the Federal Cavalry in West Virginia During the War. Kansas City, MO: Hudson-Kimberly Publishing Co.
- Scott, Robert N.; Lazelle, H. M. (1889). The War of the Rebellion: a Compilation of the Official Records of the Union and Confederate Armies Series I Volume XXVII Part I. Washington, DC: Government Printing Office. OCLC 427057.
- Scott, Robert Nicholson; Lazelle, H. M.; Davis, George B. (1891). The War of the Rebellion: A Compilation of the Official Records of the Union and Confederate Armies Series I Volume XXXVII Part 1. Washington, DC: Government Printing Office. OCLC 427057.
- Speicher, James (2009). Sumter Flying Artillery : A Civil War History of the Eleventh Battalion Georgia Light Artillery. Gretna, Louisiana: Pelican Publishing Co. ISBN 978-1-45561-267-3. OCLC 922577268.
- Starr, Stephen Z. (2007). Union Cavalry in the Civil War. Baton Rouge: Louisiana State University Press. ISBN 978-0-8071329-1-3. OCLC 153582839.
- Stevenson, James H. (1879). Boots and Saddles : A History of the First Volunteer Cavalry of the War, Known as the First New York (Lincoln) Cavalry, and also as the Sabre Regiment. Harrisburg, PA: Patriot Pub. Co. p. 320. OCLC 31947777.
- Sutton, Joseph J. (2001) [1892]. History of the Second Regiment, West Virginia Cavalry Volunteers, During the War of the Rebellion. Huntington, WV: Blue Acorn Press. ISBN 978-0-9628866-5-2. OCLC 263148491.
- Thomason, John W; Gallagher, Gary W (1994). Jeb Stuart. Lincoln, NE: University of Nebraska Press. ISBN 978-0-8032-9424-0. OCLC 30110697.
- United States Congress (1891). "The Miscellaneous Documents of the House of Representatives for the First Session of the Fifty-First Congress 1889–'90". The War of the Rebellion: A Compilation of the Official Records of the Union and Confederate Armies Series I Volume XXVII Part II. U.S. Government Printing Office. OCLC 191710879.
- United States; Congress; Senate (1886). United States Congressional Serial 49th Congress 1st Session Report No. 2887. Washington: Government Printing Office. OCLC 191710879.
- Wallace, Lew (1897). The Story of American heroism : Thrilling Narratives of Personal Adventures During the Great Civil War, as Told by the Medal Winners and Roll of Honor Men. Springfield, Ohio: J. W. Jones. OCLC 11816985.
- Wittenberg, Eric J. (2011). Gettysburg's Forgotten Cavalry Actions: Farnsworth's Charge, South Cavalry Field, and the Battle of Fairfield, July 3, 1863. New York: Savas Beatie. ISBN 978-1-61121-071-2. OCLC 779472347.
- Wittenberg, Eric J.; Petruzzi, J. David; Nugent, Michael F. (2008). One Continuous Fight: the Retreat from Gettysburg and the Pursuit of Lee's Army of Northern Virginia, July 4–14, 1863. New York: Savas Beatie. ISBN 978-1-9327144-3-2. OCLC 185031178.
- Young, Jesse Bowman (1913). The Battle of Gettysburg: a Comprehensive Narrative. New York: Harper. OCLC 1831353.
