= Battle of Moorefield order of battle =

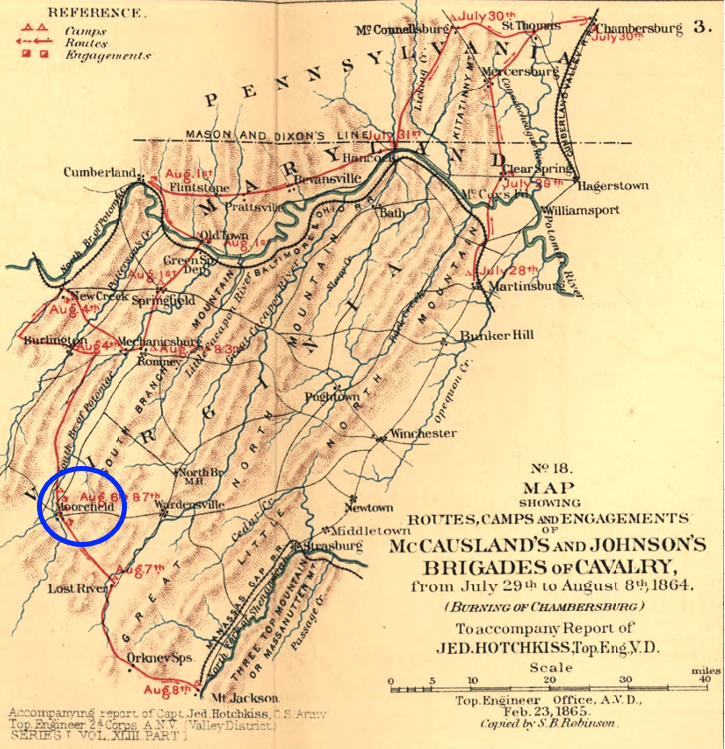
Averell caught McCausland at Moorefield

The following army units were involved in the Battle of Moorefield on August 7, 1864, near Moorefield, West Virginia, in the American Civil War. The Union Army units, and their commanders, are listed first. The Confederate Army units, and their commanders, follow. Three of the Union regiments were organized in West Virginia, and all of the Confederate regiments were organized in either Virginia, or Maryland. Most of the fighting took place within Hardy County. A small Union division commanded by Brigadier General William W. Averell surprised a larger Confederate force commanded by Brigadier General John McCausland and captured over 400 men. McCausland's force had burned the city of Chambersburg, Pennsylvania, on July 30.

== Abbreviations used ==
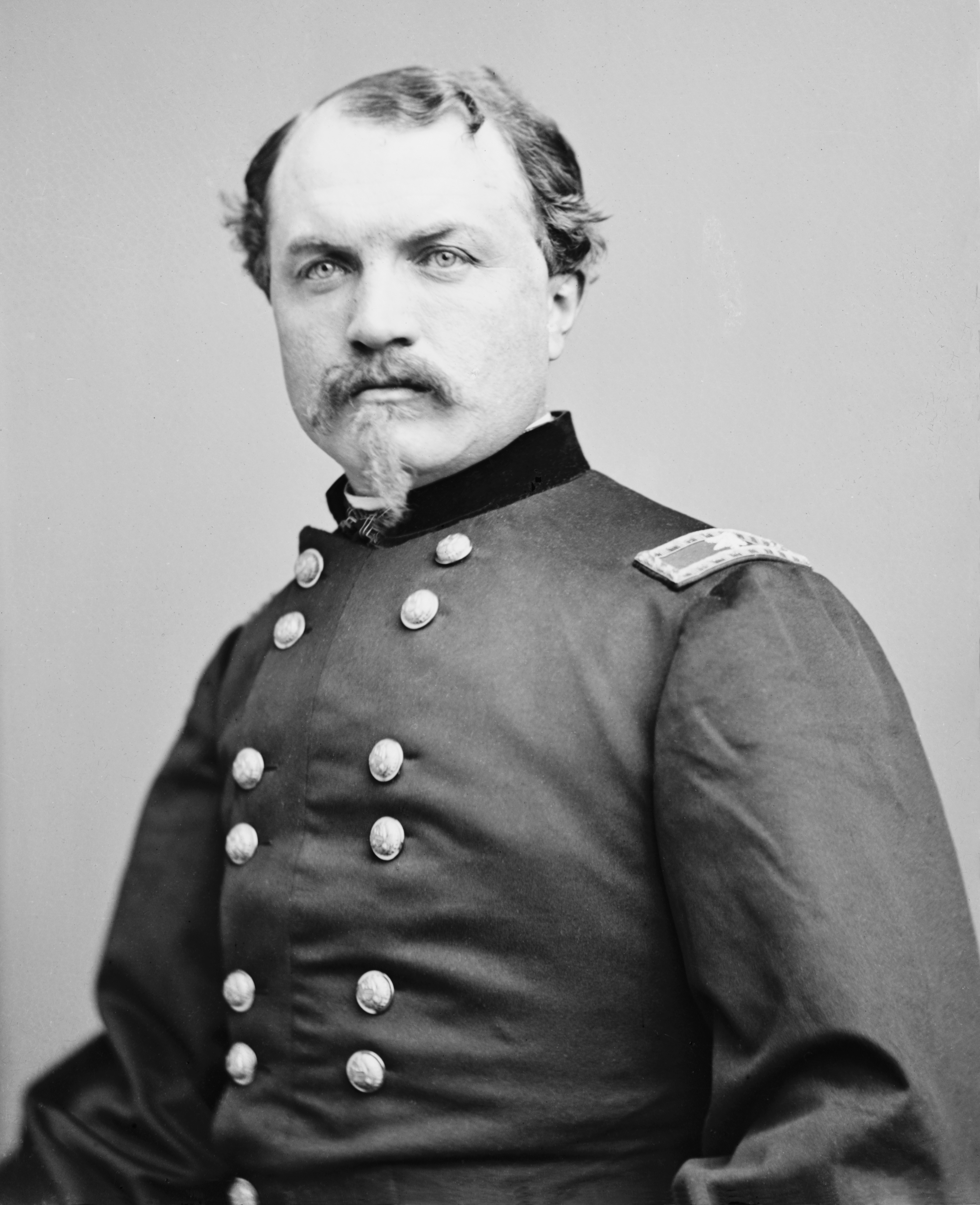
BG Averell

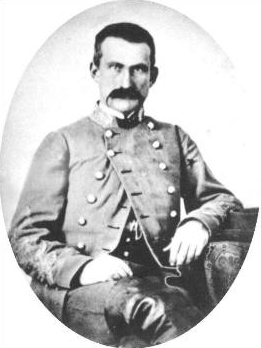
BG McCausland

=== Military rank ===
- BG = Brigadier General
- Col = Colonel
- Ltc = Lieutenant Colonel
- Maj = Major
- Capt = Captain
- Lt = 1st Lieutenant

=== Other ===
- w = wounded
- k = killed
- det = Detachment
- MOH = Medal of Honor

== Union Army Department of West Virginia ==
=== 2nd Cavalry Division, Cavalry Corps, Army of West Virginia ===
BG William W. Averell

Brigade	Regiments and Others
1st Brigade Maj Thomas Gibson (14th Pennsylvania Cavalry)	8th Ohio Cavalry: 14th Pennsylvania Cavalry: Capt Thomas R. Kerr (w), (MOH); 22nd Pennsylvania (Ringgold) Cavalry (det of 114): Maj George T. Work; Additional Information: In late 1863, the 14th Pennsylvania Cavalry was armed with seven-shot carbines, Colt's navy revolvers, and sabers.; The 14th Pennsylvania Cavalry was missing 212 men detached for duty elsewhere.; Captain Thomas Kerr of the 14th Pennsylvania Cavalry led a small scout team.
2nd Brigade Col William H. Powell (2nd West Virginia Cavalry)	1st New York (Lincoln) Cavalry (det of 386): Capt Abram Jones; 1st West Virginia Cavalry Regiment: Col Henry Capehart; 2nd West Virginia Cavalry: 3rd West Virginia Cavalry: Maj Seymour B. Conger †; Additional Information: The detachment of the 1st New York and 22nd Pennsylvania totaled to 500 men who were loaned to Averell's force on August 4.; By spring 1863, the 1st West Virginia was armed with seven-shot Spencer repeating rifles.; The 2nd West Virginia Cavalry was held in reserve and used as support for the battery.
Artillery	Battery L, 5th US Artillery: Additional Information: Battery L had two artillery pieces. In Averell's report as of August 8, the battery was listed as having four artillery pieces and commanded by Lieutenant Weir.

- Averell had approximately 1,760 men.

== Confederate Army Army of the Valley ==
=== Independent Command, Cavalry Division, Army of the Valley ===
BG John McCausland
Capt Achilles Tynes, staff

Brigade	Regiments and Others
McCausland's Brigade Col James A. Cochran	14th Virginia Cavalry: Col James A. Cochran, Capt Edwin E. Bouldin; 16th Virginia Cavalry: Col Milton J. Ferguson; 17th Virginia Cavalry: 22nd Virginia Cavalry: Ltc John T. Radford; Additional Information: None
Johnson's Brigade BG Bradley T. Johnson; Capt George W. Booth, staff	1st Maryland Cavalry Battalion: Ltc Ridgley Brown; 2nd Maryland Cavalry Battalion: Maj Henry W. Gilmor; 8th Virginia Cavalry: Col James M. Corns; 21st Virginia Cavalry: Col William E. Peters (w), Maj John Halsey; 27th Virginia Cavalry Battalion: Capt Thomas S. Gibson (w); 36th Virginia Cavalry: Major James W. Sweeney; 37th Virginia Cavalry Battalion: Ltc Ambrose C. Dunn; Additional Information: Only the 1st and 2nd Maryland, and a squadron of the 8th Virginia, had sabers. Most men were armed with long Enfield muskets, which could not be reloaded while on horseback.
Artillery	2nd Maryland Battery (Baltimore Battery): Capt William H. Grifin Lt John R. McNulty; Jackson's Charlottesville Battery: Capt Thomas Jackson; Additional Information: Jackson's Battery of horse artillery had two pieces.

- McNeill's Rangers, commanded by Captain John Hanson McNeill, were nearby—but chose to camp further away because McNeill did not believe the Confederate camp sites were safely situated.
- Approximately 3,000 men were in McCausland's command.

== Notes ==
=== References ===
- Ainsworth, Fred C.; Kirkley, Joseph W., eds. (1902). The War of the Rebellion: A Compilation of the Official Records of the Union and Confederate Armies, Additions and Corrections to Series I Volume XLIII Additions and Corrections. Washington, DC: Government Printing Office. OCLC 427057.
- Lang, Theodore F. (1895). Loyal West Virginia from 1861 to 1865 : With an Introductory Chapter on the Status of Virginia for Thirty Years Prior to the War. Baltimore, MD: Deutsch Publishing Co. OCLC 779093.
- Patchan, Scott C. (2007). Shenandoah Summer: The 1864 Valley Campaign. Lincoln, NE: University of Nebraska Press. ISBN 978-0-8032-0700-4. OCLC 122563754.
- Slease, William Davis; Gancas, Ron (1999) [1915]. The Fourteenth Pennsylvania Cavalry in the Civil War: A History of the Fourteenth Pennsylvania Volunteer Cavalry from its Organization until the Close of the Civil War, 1861-1865. Pittsburgh, Pennsylvania: Soldiers' & Sailors' Memorial Hall and Military Museum. ISBN 978-0-96449-529-6. OCLC 44503009.
- Sutton, Joseph J. (2001) [1892]. History of the Second Regiment, West Virginia Cavalry Volunteers, During the War of the Rebellion. Huntington, WV: Blue Acorn Press. ISBN 978-0-9628866-5-2. OCLC 263148491.
