= William Rumsey =

American judge (1841–1903)

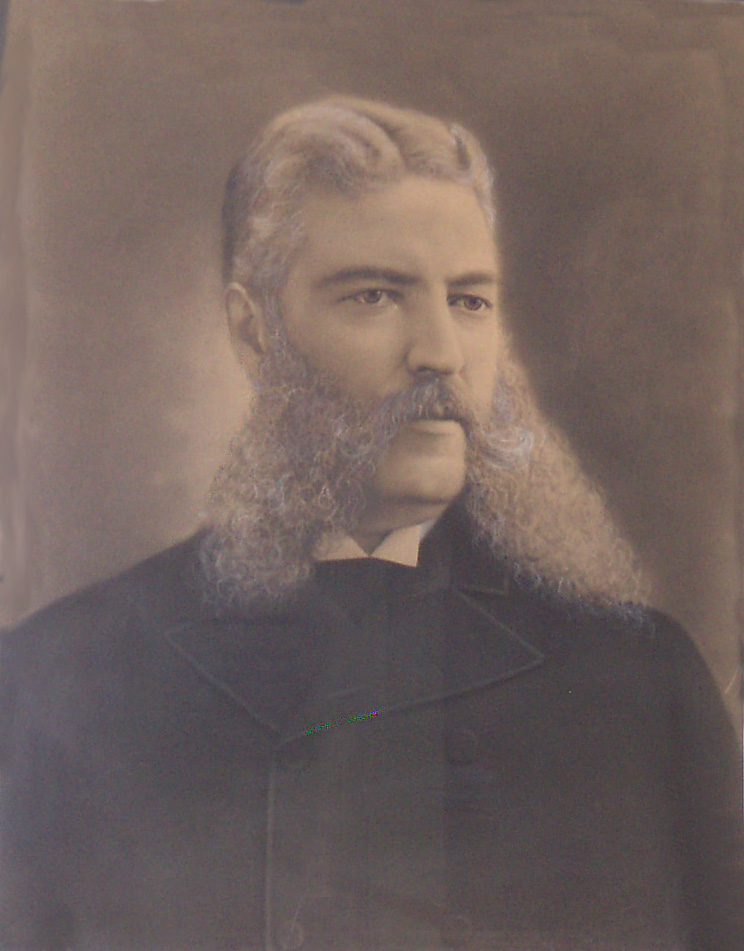
- Portrait of Rumsey

Personal details
- Born: October 18, 1841 Bath, New York, U.S.
- Died: January 16, 1903 (aged 61) New York City, U.S.
- Resting place: Grove Cemetery; Bath, New York, U.S.
- Party: Republican
- Spouse: Ella Moore Hulbert
- Children: 3
- Parent: David Rumsey (father)
- Education: Williams College
- Occupation: Lawyer; judge; military officer
- Military career
- Allegiance: United States of America: Union
- Branch: Union Army
- Service years: 1861–1865
- Rank: Major; Brevet Colonel
- Unit: 1st New York Light Artillery Regiment
- Conflicts: American Civil War; Peninsula campaign (WIA); Siege of Yorktown; Battle of Seven Pines; Valley campaigns of 1864; Battle of Moorefield

William Rumsey (October 18, 1841 – January 16, 1903) was an American lawyer and judge from New York.

== Early life ==
William Rumsey was born on October 18, 1841, in Bath, New York, to Ann E. Brown and judge David Rumsey. At the age of 16, in 1857, he attended Williams College. He was a member of the New York State Militia. At the outbreak of the American Civil War, on April 19, 1861, he left college. He was a member of Delta Kappa Epsilon. Due to his military service, the college graduated him in June 1861.

== Civil War ==
In April 1861, Rumsey was ordered to report to duty to Elmira by General Edwin D. Morgan. He served under General Robert B. Van Valkenburgh as a recruiter until October 17. He then enlisted in the 1st New York Light Artillery Regiment and became a first lieutenant and adjutant under Colonel Guilford Dudley Bailey. Two weeks after, he went with the regiment to Washington, D.C., and remained there until April 1862. He became a lieutenant and followed Colonel Bailey to the IV Corps. He then went to Newport News on April 7 and served with the Army of the Potomac. He served in the Siege of Yorktown from April 5 to May 4 and served in the Peninsula campaign alongside William H. Adams. His horse was shot from under him on May 31 and he wounded his shoulder. He was sent North and his death was reported. He rejoined his regiment at Harrison's Landing. He was promoted to captain and assistant adjutant general for his actions at the Battle of Seven Pines. He then served under General William W. Averell. He served at the Battle of Moorefield, where Averell led a column of 1,600 troops. He served under General William Tecumseh Sherman in the Valley campaigns of 1864. He was promoted to major of infantry on May 25, 1865. He was discharged in October 1865. Following the war, he was brevetted lieutenant colonel for his "distinguished services in the campaign of May, June and July, 1864". In 1868 he was brevetted colonel "for meritorious services throughout the conflict".

== Career ==
In February 1866, Rumsey traveled with United States Minister to Japan Van Valkenburgh, his former commander, to Japan. He served as private secretary to Van Valkenburgh for two years. He returned to Bath in February 1868. He then studied law at his father's law office and was admitted to the bar on December 8, 1868. He was also a public speaker for the Republican Party. From 1873 to 1880, he had a law partnership with M. R. Miller of Bath.

In 1880, he was elected to replace his father on the Supreme Court, 7th District. Rumsey's candidacy for the Supreme Court for the Seventh District in 1880 generated considerable bitterness within the Republican Party. The elder Rumsey had reputedly cut a deal with Steuben County Judge Guy McMaster in 1873 that entailed that he, McMaster, would succeed Rumsey Sr. upon the latter's retirement. In addition, several factions had grown up in the district Republican bar which had come to a tacit arrangement to rotate the nominations for election to judicial vacancies between them. Rumsey Jr's nomination violated both principles. The opposition press in Rochester, New York, was not impressed "Little is known of the younger Rumsey" wrote the Union & Advertiser, "and the less of that little said, the better." Rumsey captured the fall election in the heavily Republican Seventh District.

In 1886, he was considered as a Republican candidate for the Court of Appeals. In 1890, he was nominated for the position, but was defeated by John Clinton Gray by a majority of 3,044 votes. In 1887, he was appointed by Governor David B. Hill alongside David Dudley Field II and David L. Follett to revise the code of evidence. In 1895, he was elected to the Supreme Court of the 7th Judicial district. In 1896, he was appointed as an associate justice of the appellate division and assigned to the 1st Department of New York in Manhattan. In 1901, his judicial term expired and he was reappointed and assigned to the Appellate Division for the Fourth Department in Rochester. He resigned in the fall of 1901. In December 1891, Rumsey moved to New York City to head the law firm Rumsey, Sheppard & Ingram on Liberty Street with his son-in-law John Sheppard. Rumsey wrote several books, including "Rumsey's Practice".

== Personal life ==
Rumsey married Ella Moore Hulbert of Brooklyn. He had a son and two daughters, David, Blanche and Mrs. John S. Sheppard. He lived in Bath. He was a member of Custer Post, No. 81 of the Grand Army of the Republic of Bath and the New York Commandery of the Loyal Legion.

Rumsey had rheumatism. He died on January 16, 1903, at his home on 56th Street in New York City. He was buried in Grove Cemetery in Bath.

== Awards ==
Rumsey received an honorary Doctor of Laws from Williams College following his appointment to the Supreme Court in 1880.
