= 14th Pennsylvania Cavalry Regiment =

14th Pennsylvania Cavalry in the American Civil War 1862–1865

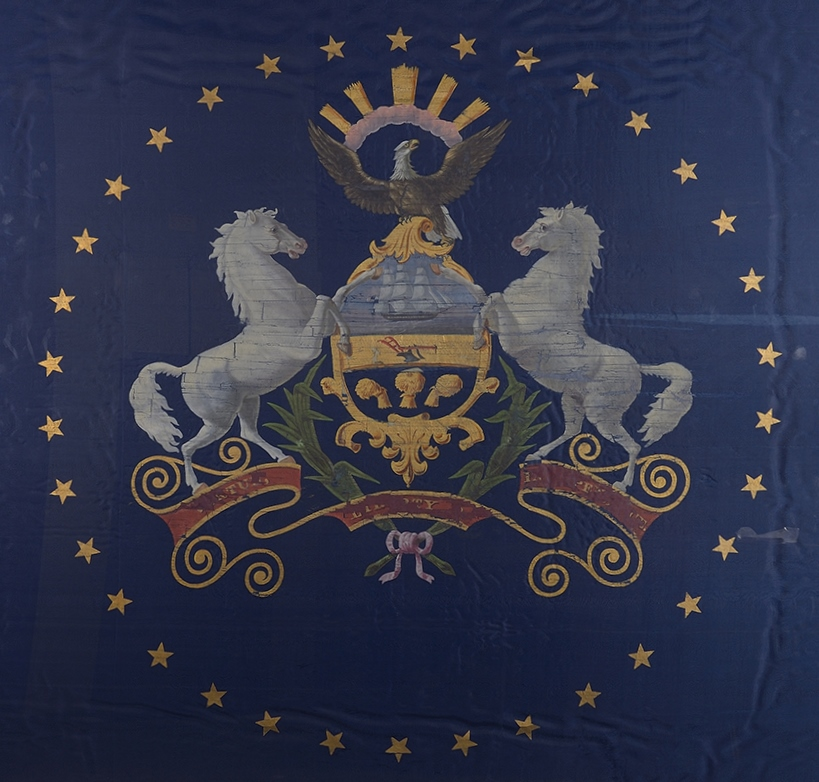
- State flag of Pennsylvania, c. 1863
- Active: November 23, 1862, to August 24, 1865
- Country: United States
- Allegiance: (Union (American Civil War)) Union; Pennsylvania
- Branch: Union Army
- Type: Cavalry
- Size: Regiment
- Engagements: American Civil War 1863: Battle of White Sulphur Springs, Battle of Droop Mountain 1864: Battle of Cove Mountain, Battle of Lynchburg, Second Battle of Kernstown, Battle of Moorefield, Third Battle of Winchester, Battle of Fisher's Hill, Battle of Cedar Creek, Action at Nineveh

Commanders
- Colonel: James M. Schoonmaker
- Lt. Col: William Blakeley
- Major: Thomas Gibson
- Major: John M. Daily
- Major: Shadrack Foley
- Captain: Ashbell F. Duncan

The 14th Pennsylvania Cavalry Regiment (also known as the 159th Pennsylvania Volunteers) was a cavalry regiment of the Union Army during the American Civil War. Most of its fighting happened in the last half of 1863 and full year 1864. The regiment fought mainly in West Virginia and Virginia, often as part of a brigade or division commanded by Brigadier General William W. Averell and later Brigadier General William Powell.

The regiment was organized near Pittsburgh between August and November 1862. With the exception of one company from the Philadelphia area, its recruits were from western Pennsylvania. The regiment's original commander, Colonel James M. Schoonmaker, was one of the youngest regimental commanders in the Union Army at 20 years old. Pittsburgh attorney William Blakeley was the regiment's original lieutenant colonel.

The regiment saw significant action at the Battle of White Sulphur Springs, Battle of Droop Mountain, Battle of Moorefield, and the Third Battle of Winchester. The regiment had two officers and 97 enlisted men killed or mortally wounded, while disease killed 296 enlisted men. The three original majors were Thomas Gibson, Shadrack Foley, and John M. Daily. Captain Thomas R. Kerr won the Medal of Honor for capturing a regimental flag at Moorefield where he was an advance scout, while Schoonmaker received the same award for action at the Third Battle of Winchester.

== Formation and organization ==
James M. Schoonmaker, of Pittsburgh, began recruiting during August 1862. At the time, he was a lieutenant in the Union's 1st Maryland Cavalry Regiment. During recruiting, newspapers sometimes referred to Schoonmaker's cavalry as the "Stanton Cavalry". With the exception of Philadelphia's Company A, recruiting was conducted in western Pennsylvania. The men were mustered into service from August 21 through November 4, 1862, for three years. The regiment was mustered into service on November 23, 1862, as the 14th Pennsylvania Volunteer Cavalry. In Pennsylvania, the regiment was also known as the One Hundred and Fifty-Ninth Pennsylvania Volunteers, since it was the 159th regiment of any branch raised in Pennsylvania.

Original leadership was Schoonmaker as Colonel and William H. Blakeley as lieutenant colonel. (Note: The spelling of Lieutenant Colonel William H. Blakeley's surname used herein is "Blakeley", which matches the spelling in his 1899 obituary and additional sources. Other sources, including the regimental historian and Averell, have spelled it as "Blakely".) Thomas Gibson, Shadrack Foley, and John M. Daily were majors commanding the First, Second, and Third battalions, respectively. Schoonmaker was only 20 years and four months old at the time, making him one of the youngest regiment commanders in the Union Army. The regiment spent time at Camp Howe and Camp Montgomery, near Pittsburgh, before moving to Hagerstown, Maryland on November 24, where it received horses, arms, and equipment. On December 28, the regiment moved to Harper's Ferry, Virginia, where it was assigned picket and reconnaissance (scouting) duty.

== Early action ==
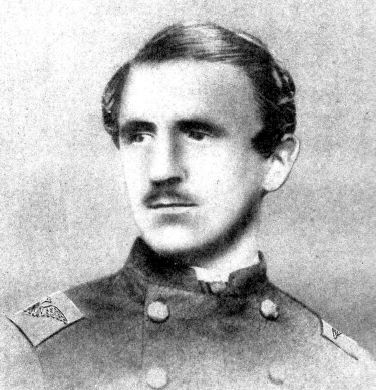
Col. Schoonmaker

On May 7, 1863, a detachment of unmounted men was left in Harper's Ferry under the command of Major Foley, while the remaining portion of the regiment joined the 4th Separate Brigade of the VIII Army Corps at Grafton, Virginia (now West Virginia). In addition to protecting the B&O Railroad terminal at Grafton, the regiment also protected nearby communities such as Philippi, Beverly and Webster. On May 23, Brigadier General William W. Averell took command of the brigade, which consisted of one cavalry regiment, three mounted infantry regiments, two infantry regiments, a cavalry battalion, and two batteries. (Note: Averell's brigade consisted of the following regiments: 10th West Virginia Infantry, 28th Ohio Infantry, 2nd West Virginia Mounted Infantry, 3rd West Virginia Mounted Infantry, 8th West Virginia Mounted Infantry, and the 14th Pennsylvania Cavalry. Other units were Company A of the 1st West Virginia Cavalry, Company C of the 3rd West Virginia Cavalry, 3rd Independent Company Ohio Cavalry, Company C of the 16th Illinois Cavalry, Battery B of the 1st West Virginia Artillery (six guns), and Battery G of the 1st West Virginia Artillery (four guns).) Early in the morning on July 3, Major Gibson led two squadrons of the 14th Pennsylvania Cavalry as they rescued an infantry regiment near Beverly.

The regiment took part in the pursuit of Robert E. Lee's Army of Northern Virginia as it was retreating from Pennsylvania to Virginia after the Battle of Gettysburg. On July 4, Major Foley led a force of 300 men (including men from the 14th Pennsylvania Cavalry and other regiments) that burned a bridge over the Potomac River and captured enemy soldiers. On July 13, Colonel Schoonmaker led most of the regiment as it was involved with capturing one of Lee's supply trains and several hundred prisoners. Foley's detachment rejoined the regiment shortly after July 15.

== Averell's raids in 1863 and 1864 ==
=== Lewisburg and the law books ===
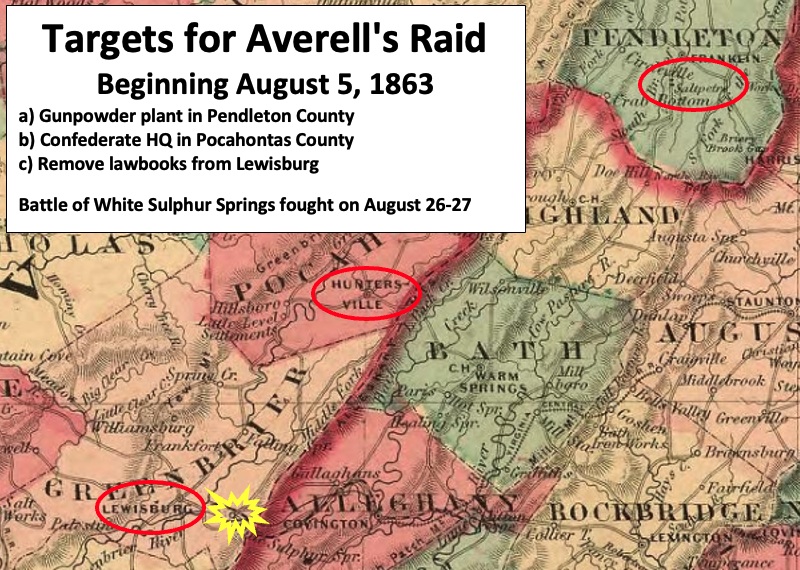
Union Army plan

Averell received new orders, dated August 12, to retrieve law books from Lewisburg and attack several targets at points in between. Significant fighting began on the morning of August 26 west of White Sulphur Springs when Averell's advance guard was intercepted by Confederate troops.

A soldier from another regiment wrote that during the battle the 14th Pennsylvania "made one of the most daring charges of the war, not only facing a murderous storm of leaden hail from the front but also, to their surprise, received an enfilading fire along their flank from a large body of infantry concealed in a cornfield...." The charge was led by Colonel Schoonmaker and Captain John Bird from Company G. Bird was wounded, captured, and eventually taken to Libby Prison. Schoonmaker's horse was shot but he escaped on a dead soldier's horse.

Over 100 men from the 14th Pennsylvania Cavalry were killed, wounded, or captured in the battle—nearly half of all Union casualties. Fighting ended by the morning of the next day as both sides were almost out of ammunition. The battle became known as the Battle of White Sulphur Springs, and Averell was prevented from reaching Lewisburg.

=== Lewisburg and the railroad ===
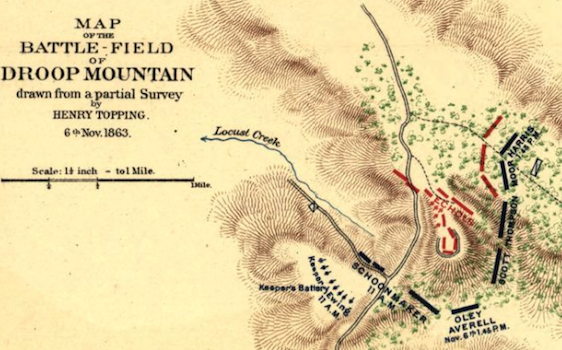
Schoonmaker and the 14th Pennsylvania Cavalry, with most of the artillery, occupied the main road to Droop Mountain

On October 23, Averell was ordered to capture, or drive away, a Confederate force stationed near Lewisburg in Greenbrier County, West Virginia. After Lewisburg, Averell was to attack the Virginia and Tennessee Railroad near Dublin Station.

Averell departed on November 1, and his force was intercepted before it could get to Lewisburg. At Droop Mountain on the November 6, Schoonmaker commanded a portion of Averell's force that included the 14th Pennsylvania Cavalry and most of the artillery. They created a diversion that enabled two of Averell's infantry regiments to flank the Confederate mountaintop position, causing Confederate troops to be partially surrounded before they fled south to Lewisburg. The Confederate troops were soundly defeated, but many escaped and the raid on the railroad was called off.

=== Salem raid ===
Averell's raid on the Salem depot of the Virginia and Tennessee Railroad began on December 8, when his brigade departed from New Creek (present day Keyser, West Virginia). Colonel Schoonmaker was sick and hospitalized, so the 14th Pennsylvania Cavalry was commanded by Lieutenant Colonel William H. Blakeley. Majors Daily and Foley were also with the regiment, and Major Gibson led his independent command.

The 14th Pennsylvania Cavalry was armed with Spencer seven-shot carbines, Colt's Navy revolvers, and sabers. Reaching Salem, Virginia, on December 16, the brigade spent only six hours destroying railroad infrastructure because they discovered that Major General Fitzhugh Lee's Cavalry Brigade was on a train moving to Salem. On the return north, Averell split his command with Averell leading one column and the 14th's Lieutenant Colonel Blakeley leading the other. Blakeley's column met Confederate troops on the evening of December 19 near Covington, Virginia, and the Jackson River. Averell's column was able to cross a bridge over the river, but Blakeley with Company A from the 14th Pennsylvania Cavalry were the only ones from Blakeley's column that crossed the bridge before it was burned. The Union soldiers on the safe side of the burned bridge continued north.

Those that could not cross the bridge, including all but one company from the 14th Pennsylvania, were thought to have been captured—but fighting continued all night. Confederate officers contacted the regiment's Major Foley demanding surrender. Foley refused—and men from the regiment began shouting "the 14th Pennsylvania Cavalry never surrenders". A place about two miles (3.2 km) upriver was successfully used to ford the river, and Foley's assumed-captured force caught up with Averell in the Allegheny Mountains. (Note: A Pennsylvania newspaper says Blakeley remained with the regiment, as does at least one of Blakeley's obituaries. Reverend Slease of Company C of the 14th Pennsylvania Cavalry, when discussing the 14th "never surrenders" in his book, says "The friends of Lieut. Col. Blakely ascribed it to him. It is certain it was not he, for he, with Co. A., was already on the opposite side of the river.") Casualties for the regiment were six drowned, five wounded, and 25 captured in the attempted bridge crossing.

=== Crook-Averell 1864 Raid on the Virginia and Tennessee Railroad ===
At the beginning of 1864, Averell's Brigade, including the 14th Pennsylvania Cavalry, had its winter quarters at Martinsburg, West Virginia. Averell was given command of the 2nd Cavalry Division, which included the 14th Pennsylvania Cavalry in a brigade commanded by Colonel Schoonmaker. The 14th Pennsylvania Cavalry was commanded by Major Daily.

In late April, Averell's division joined Brigadier General George Crook for dual raids on the Virginia and Tennessee Railroad. Averell led a cavalry force of 2,079 men and attacked further west from Crook. After abandoning an attack on a salt mine, Averell proceeded east toward Wytheville and its lead mine, to "prevent the enemy from concentrating against General Crook". On May 10, Schoonmaker's brigade started the fighting in the four–hour Battle of Cove Mountain. The fighting was inclusive, and Averell's force escaped at night after suffering 114 casualties.

== Hunter's attack on Lynchburg ==
Averell and Crook arrived in Staunton, Virginia, on June 8 as ordered by Major General David Hunter. The cavalry was reorganized on June 9, with Averell in command of the 2nd Division. Schoonmaker commanded one of three brigades in the 2nd Division, and it consisted of the 8th Ohio Cavalry Regiment and the 14th Pennsylvania Cavalry. Major Daily commanded the 14th Pennsylvania Cavalry.

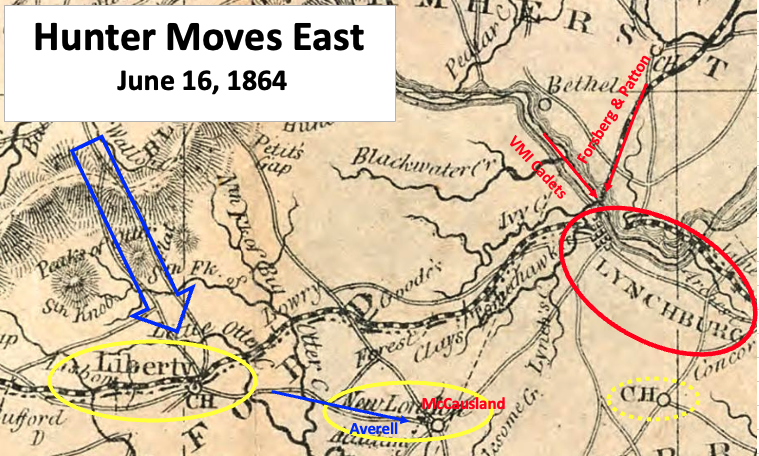
Averell's division reached New London while Confederate reinforcements began arriving at Lynchburg

Advancing toward Lynchburg, Averell's division arrived in Lexington on June 11, with the 14th Pennsylvania Cavalry in the advance. Hunter ordered the Virginia Military Institute (a.k.a. VMI) buildings bombed and destroyed, and relieved Schoonmaker from command because Schoonmaker did not burn VMI immediately when he took the town. On the next day, Hunter ordered Schoonmaker to proceed south with his brigade, and handed Schoonmaker a paper that said Hunter's treatment of Schoonmaker "had been under a misapprehension".

At sunrise on June 17, Averell moved toward Lynchburg until it was about four miles (6.4 km) away. At that time, a battle began with Schoonmaker's brigade arriving first and deploying on the left side of the pike. The cavalry fought dismounted until late in the afternoon, when it was replaced by infantry and artillery. Fighting continued on the next day with the cavalry back in front, although the Union forces were now on the defensive. That evening the Union Army retreated westward. The regiment's casualties from June 10 through June 23 totaled 27.

== Kernstown ==
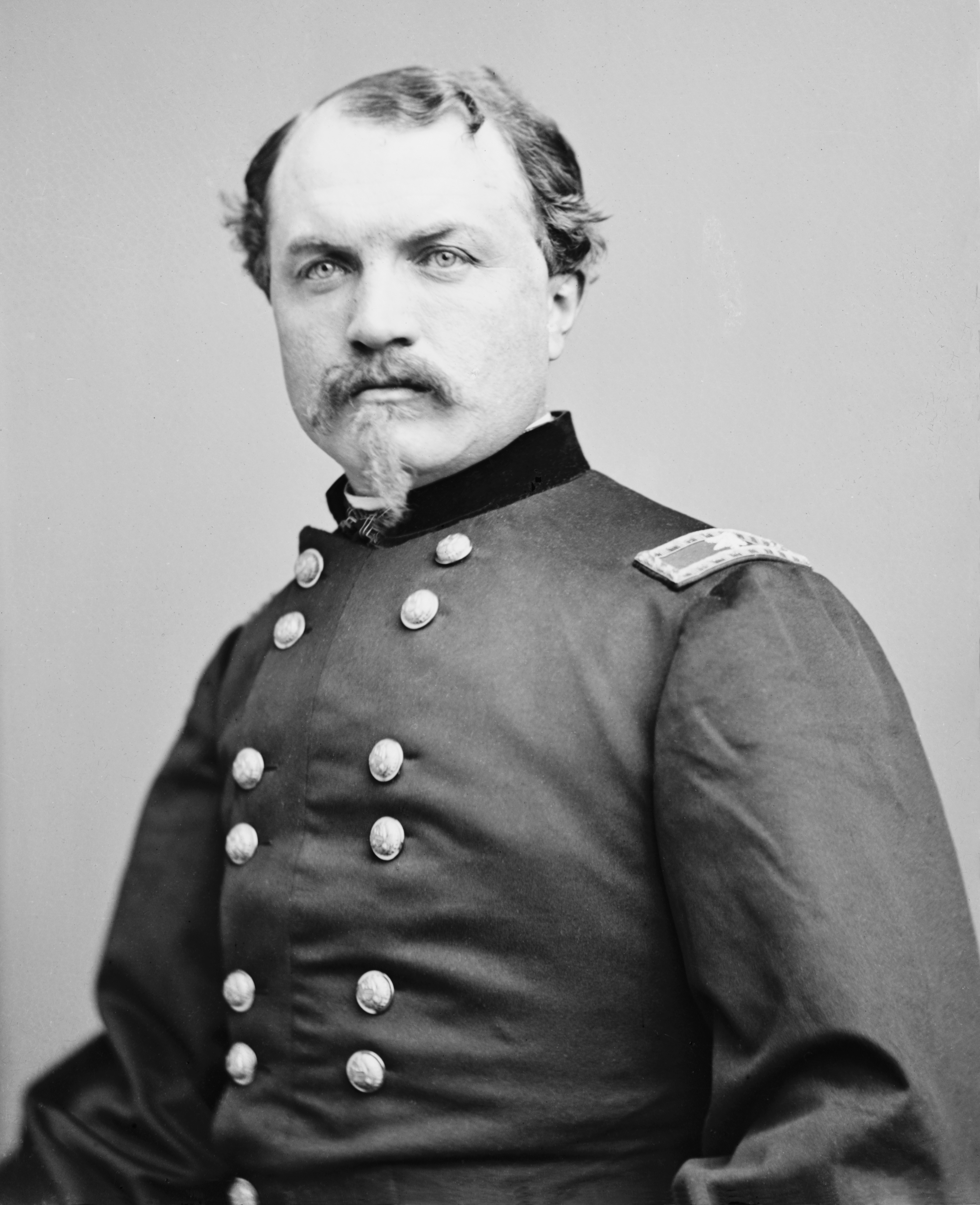
Br. Gen. Averell

In July, the regiment moved to Martinsburg, Virginia, and was part of the 1st Brigade, 2nd Cavalry Division, Army of West Virginia. The regiment, brigade, and division commanders were still the same, and Hunter was still commander of the Department of West Virginia, but Brigadier General Crook commanded the army in the field. On July 24, Crook ordered Averell to conduct a flanking maneuver near the Front Royal road to cut off what Crook believed was a small band of Confederates.

By 11:00 am, Schoonmaker's brigade began the maneuver as the advance, and discovered a huge Confederate force trying to turn the Union left flank. While Crook's infantry was falling back, Confederate infantry tried to cut off Averell from the rest of Crook's army. Confederate infantry on foot could not outrace Averell's cavalry, but they did cause a panic—especially Schoonmaker's brigade that had absorbed the brunt of the initial attack. Union forces retreated through Winchester, continued across the Potomac River, and finally stopped at Hagerstown, Maryland. The Second Battle of Kernstown was a major defeat for Crook. Union casualties were 1,185 killed, wounded or missing; including 13 for the 14th Pennsylvania Cavalry.

== Chambersburg and Moorefield ==
During late July and early August, Colonel Schoonmaker was running a camp for dismounted cavalry in Pleasant Valley, Maryland. Lieutenant Colonel Blakeley led a detachment from the dismounted cavalry camp that assisted Brigadier General Wesley Merritt's division in August, and he was badly injured in an incident with his horse. The remaining portion of the regiment was with Averell, who was stationed in Hagerstown and had troops guarding nearby fords along the Potomac River. Averell had only 1,260 men and two pieces of artillery in his command. Major Gibson, who had been leading an independent cavalry battalion, returned to the regiment, and was assigned command of the 1st Brigade. Captain Thomas R. Kerr was assigned command of the regiment.

=== Chambersburg ===
After Lieutenant General Jubal Early's victory in the Second Battle of Kernstown, he sent two cavalry brigades north under the command of Brigadier General John McCausland. On July 30, McCausland burnt the town of Chambersburg, Pennsylvania, and then moved west. The 14th Pennsylvania Cavalry, led by Major Gibson, entered the town's main street too late to save anything. On August 3, Averell received an order to continue his pursuit of McCausland and attack "wherever found".

=== Moorefield ===
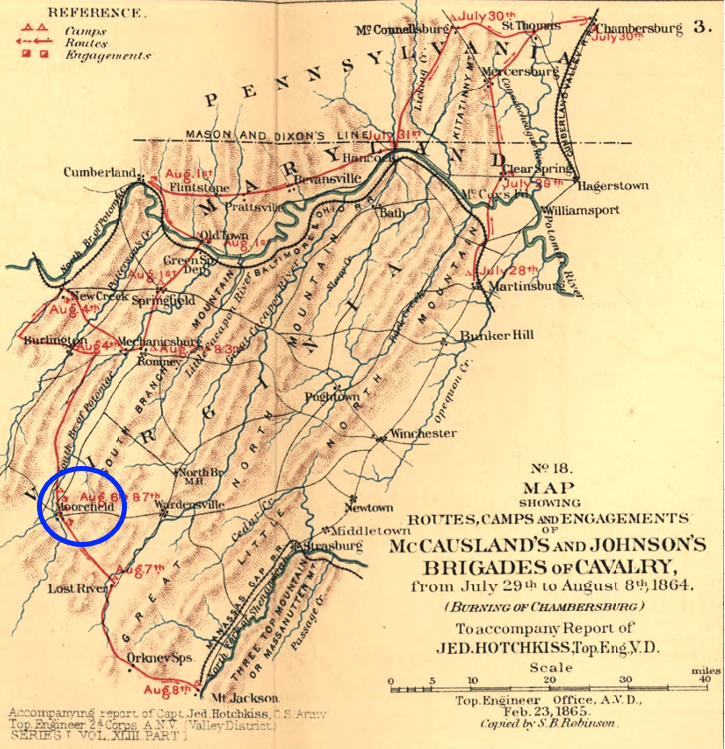
After a pursuit that began in Chambersburg, Averell caught McCausland near Moorefield

Averell learned that McCausland was moving south toward Moorefield, West Virginia. The Union force continued south from Romney on August 7. It was led by a group of scouts dressed in Confederate uniforms, followed by the main force far enough behind that it could not be detected. Captain Kerr of the 14th Pennsylvania Cavalry led the scouts, and they were mostly from the 14th Pennsylvania's Company C and D. At about 2:30 am, Kerr's scouts began deceiving and capturing various squads of Confederate pickets posted along the main road.

Early in the morning, about 60 of Kerr's scouts, wearing Confederate uniforms, entered one of two Confederate camps and calmly moved further south past the Confederate 1st Maryland Cavalry. Then Gibson's Brigade, including the 14th Pennsylvania Cavalry, attacked the surprised Confederates, and captured more than they could control. Kerr was shot in the face and thigh, and his horse killed—yet he captured the flag of the 8th Virginia Cavalry and rode away on the color bearer's horse.

The Confederate brigade on the south side of the river had some warning of the attack, but was defeated and scattered by one of Averell's other brigades. In total, Averell captured 27 officers and 393 enlisted men, 4 artillery pieces, and 400 horses. The Confederate killed and wounded was unknown. Union losses were 7 killed and 21 wounded. A Union soldier estimated that the "loss to the enemy in killed, wounded and captured was near eight hundred". Captain Thomas R. Kerr, of the 14th Pennsylvania Cavalry, was awarded the Medal of Honor.

== Shenandoah Valley ==
In mid-August, Major General Philip Sheridan reorganized his cavalry. Averell was made commander of the 2nd Division, with Schoonmaker and Colonel William H. Powell as his brigade commanders. Schoonmaker's 1st Brigade consisted of the 14th Pennsylvania, 22nd Pennsylvania, and 8th Ohio. The 14th Pennsylvania Cavalry would now be fighting in the Shenandoah Valley as part of a large army.

=== Third Battle of Winchester ===
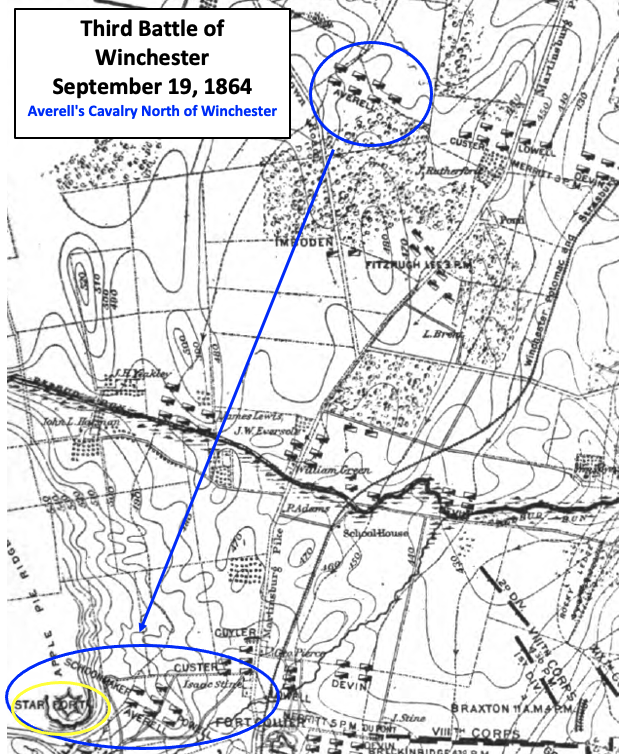
Schoonmaker's Brigade was part of the Union attack from the north.

On September 19, Sheridan's army of 40,000 soldiers defeated Early's army of 15,000 in the Third Battle of Winchester (a.k.a. the Battle of Opequon Creek). While a large portion of the Union Army attacked from the east, Averell's cavalry and an additional cavalry division attacked from the north. Major Foley had been wounded earlier in the month, so Captain Ashbel F. Duncan led the regiment.

Close to the north edge of town, Averell ordered Schoonmaker to capture Star Fort, which stood on a hill and had a well-supported battery. The brigade's first charge was unsuccessful. Captain Duncan led about 300 fighters from the 14th Pennsylvania Cavalry that attempted to capture the fort's guns while another portion of the regiment moved around the flank of the enemy. While this was happening, Schoonmaker was notified that Duncan had been killed. Schoonmaker hurried up the hill to lead in person, and found the mortally–wounded Duncan still alive and mounted. The regiment captured one of the Confederate cannons and about 300 soldiers while the rest of the Confederates fled before they were surrounded.

The 14th Pennsylvania Cavalry had 14 of the 19 casualties for Schoonmaker's brigade. Schoonmaker was later awarded the Medal of Honor for the capture of the fort. Summarizing the battle, Confederate General Early wrote that his army "deserved the victory, and would have had it, but for the enemy's immense superiority in cavalry, which alone gave it to him".

=== Fisher's Hill ===
The Battle of Fisher's Hill occurred on September 21–22, 1864. Sheridan's army again defeated Early's army. The battle took place further south of Winchester near the Valley Pike, slightly south of Strasburg, Virginia. In this battle, Schoonmaker's brigade attacked the front of the Confederate left while Crook's infantry flanked the Confederate left using a concealed approach. Early's army fled south in disorder, and were pursued by the other half of Averell's division. The 14th Pennsylvania Cavalry had only one man wounded. After the battle, Sheridan replaced Averell with Powell. Averell chose two companies from the 14th Pennsylvania Cavalry, Companies A and H, to escort him to Winchester.

=== Weyer's Cave and the Burning ===
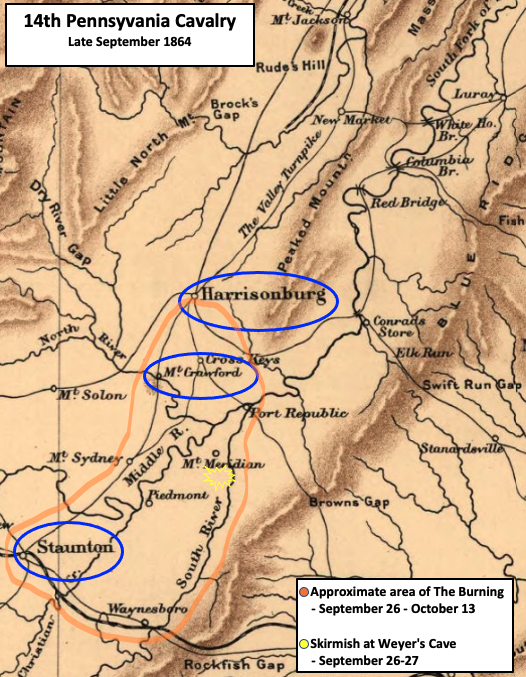
The 14th Pennsylvania was near Harrisonburg and Staunton in late September

Following the Battle of Fisher's Hill, the two armies continued south along the pike. Major Daily commanded the regiment while Schoonmaker commanded the 1st Brigade. Lieutenant Colonel Blakeley was in Pittsburgh for a court martial case, Major Gibson was under arrest, and Major Foley was in a hospital. Powell's Division patrolled the areas around Harrisonburg, Mount Crawford, and Staunton.

The division arrived at Weyer's Cave in the afternoon of September 26, and Schoonmaker's Brigade crossed the South River and attacked enemy cavalry. The brigade drove the Confederate cavalry east until it encountered infantry and artillery. Fighting until dark, the brigade returned to Weyer's Cave on the west side of the river. On the morning of September 27, fighting began again and it was discovered that the Confederate army had as many as five divisions. The regiment was driven back, but contested its position so well that the Adjutant General of Pennsylvania ordered an inscription on the 14th Pennsylvania's regimental battle flag that read: "Weyer's Cave September 27th 1864 For Gallantry in Battle."

Near the close of the skirmish at Weyer's Cave, Major General George Armstrong Custer arrived to succeed Powell as commander of the division. Early's army moved to Staunton and Waynesboro, while Powell's/Custer's Division moved to Port Republic. For the next two weeks, Custer's 2nd Division, including the 14th Pennsylvania Cavalry, was among those assigned to burn the region's farming infrastructure. Over 2,000 barns, 70 mills, and food located between Harrisonburg and Staunton were destroyed. On September 30, Custer was transferred to command the 3rd Cavalry Division, and Powell returned to command the 2nd Cavalry Division.

=== Cedar Creek ===
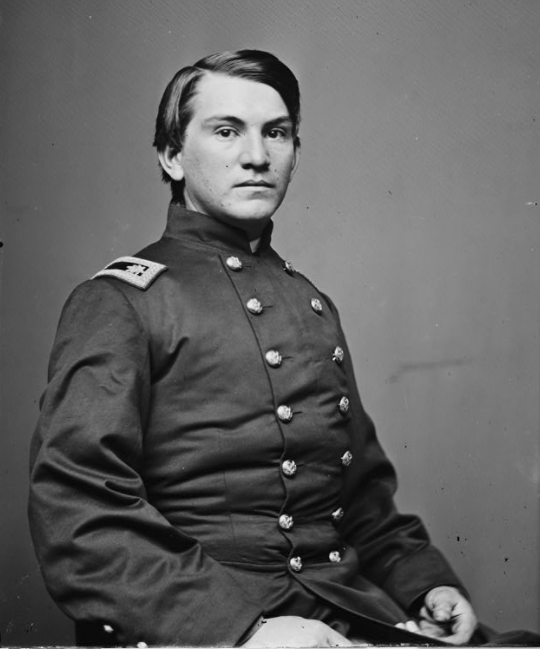
Major Gibson

The Battle of Cedar Creek started as a surprise attack by Early's army in the early morning hours of October 19, 1864. Early struck the Union Army's left flank where the only Union cavalry nearby was the 1st Cavalry Brigade from Powell's division. The brigade was composed of three cavalry regiments, including the 14th Pennsylvania, and was commanded by Colonel Alpheus Moore of the 8th Ohio Cavalry. Major Gibson commanded the 14th Pennsylvania.

During the morning fighting, the "officer in command of the brigade" (Colonel Moore) refused to dismount his men to support the division of Brigadier General Thomas Devin. The battle appeared to be a defeat for the Union until General Sheridan arrived and rallied his troops for a Union victory. Only one soldier from the 14th Pennsylvania Cavalry was wounded. After the battle, Colonel Moore was placed under arrest, and Major Gibson became commander of the 1st Brigade.

=== Mosby ===
Beginning November 10, the 21st New York Cavalry Regiment was assigned to the 1st Brigade of Powell's 2nd Division. Colonel William B. Tibbits, from the 21st New York Cavalry, was assigned to command the 1st Brigade, relieving Major Gibson. Separately, Major Daily was dismissed for absence without leave effective November 11, but reinstated seven months later as a lieutenant colonel.

While cooking turkeys on Thanksgiving Day (November 24), the regiment was attacked by Mosby's guerrillas. Mosby was quickly chased off by the regiment, and ten of Mosby's men were killed or wounded. The historian of the 14th Pennsylvania Cavalry wrote that probably "no regiment in the Civil War had more encounters with Mosby or lost so many killed and wounded or captured by Mosby".

Major Gibson was assigned command of the 1st Brigade on December 7. A few weeks later on December 17, Captain William Miles of Company I led 100 men on a scouting expedition toward Ashby's Gap. Mosby ambushed this scouting party from a woods near Millwood, Virginia, killing Miles and about a dozen others. About 20 others were wounded, and nearly everybody else was captured. Mosby set one man free after slashing his face with a saber, allowing him to return to camp to tell the story of the ambush. The wounded and dead were recovered on the next day.

== Winter 1864-1865 and war's end ==
=== Winter ===
The regiment's winter camp was located in Winchester. The organization of Sheridan's Middle Military Division at the end of 1864 had Powell in command of the 2nd Cavalry Division, Tibbits in command of the division's 1st Brigade, and Schoonmaker in command of the 14th Pennsylvania Cavalry. Lieutenant Colonel Blakeley, who had been dismissed, was restored to commission. (Note: Blakeley was hospitalized after being thrown from his horse on August 12. While in the hospital, his detachment left its post, causing his dismissal. The general in charge did not know Blakeley was in the hospital. After a petition and letter saying the recommendation for dismissal came under misapprehension of the facts, Blakeley was reinstated December 14.) The regiment's final expedition of the winter began on February 19, 1865, and ended with Major Gibson and his men ambushed by Mosby. Gibson's horse was shot and fell on him, although he was eventually able to find another horse and escape. Gibson's loss was one officer wounded, and 80 men missing.

=== Fighting ends ===
The regiment left winter camp on April 4, and moved up the Shenandoah Valley. Major Foley resigned on April 6. Confederate General Lee surrendered at Appomattox on April 9, and the regiment was ordered to Washington on April 20. For the next month, they camped in Virginia at Arlington, Fairfax Court House, and Alexandria. The men of the regiment whose term of enlistment expired prior to October 1, 1865, mustered out in late May and early June. Lieutenant Colonel Blakeley resigned effective June 6.

The remainder of the regiment was consolidated into six companies and left the Washington area on June 11. They arrived in Fort Leavenworth in Kansas on June 28, and the reinstated Major Daily was promoted to lieutenant colonel on that day. Most of the soldiers mustered out on July 31, including Colonel Schoonmaker. Everyone else, other than Company A, mustered out on August 24. Company A mustered out on November 2.

=== Summary ===
The regiment fought mostly as part of a brigade or division commanded by William W. Averell. Later in the war, they were often part of a division commanded by William H. Powell. The regiment did most of its fighting in West Virginia and Virginia. It began its fighting in Beverly, West Virginia, on July 3, 1863. Its last fight was in Virginia at Ashby's Gap on February 19, 1865. In between, members of the regiment fought in nearly 90 skirmishes and battles. In 31 of those engagements, the regiment suffered casualties. The regiment had two Medal of Honor winners (Schoonmaker and Kerr), and two of its men (Schoonmaker and Gibson) commanded brigades. During the war, the regiment lost 2 officers and 97 enlisted men killed or mortally wounded. Disease resulted in the death of 296 enlisted men.

== See also ==
- List of Pennsylvania Civil War units

== Notes ==
=== References ===
- Averell, William W. (1889). "Reports of Brig. Gen. William W. Averell...operations May 22–July 28, 1863". In Scott, Robert N. (ed.). The War of the Rebellion: a Compilation of the Official Records of the Union and Confederate Armies Series I Volume XXVII - Part II - Reports. Washington, DC: Government Printing Office. pp. 205–211. OCLC 318422190.
- Averell, William W. (1890). "Reports of Brig. Gen. William W. Averell...operations August 5–31". In Scott, Robert N. (ed.). The War of the Rebellion: a Compilation of the Official Records of the Union and Confederate Armies Series I Volume XXIX - Part I - Reports. Washington, DC: Government Printing Office. pp. 32–40. OCLC 318422190.
- Averell, William W. (1890b). "Reports of Brig. Gen. William W. Averell...expedition to Virginia and Tennessee Railroad". In Scott, Robert N. (ed.). The War of the Rebellion: a Compilation of the Official Records of the Union and Confederate Armies Series I Volume XXIX - Part I - Reports. Washington, DC: Government Printing Office. pp. 924–933. OCLC 318422190.
- Averell, William W. (1891). "Report of Brig. Gen. William W. Averell....". In Davis, George B.; Perry, Leslie J.; Kirkley, Joseph W. (eds.). The War of the Rebellion: a Compilation of the Official Records of the Union and Confederate Armies Series I Volume XXXVII - Part I - Reports, Correspondence, etc. Washington, DC: Government Printing Office. pp. 41–44. OCLC 318422190.
- Averell, William W. (1891a). "Correspondence of Brig. Gen. William W. Averell to Lieut. Col. Charles G. Halpine". In Davis, George B.; Perry, Leslie J.; Kirkley, Joseph W. (eds.). The War of the Rebellion: a Compilation of the Official Records of the Union and Confederate Armies Series I Volume XXXVII - Part II - Correspondence, Etc. Washington, DC: Government Printing Office. p. 10. OCLC 427057. Archived from the original on February 12, 2023.
- Averell, William W. (1893). "Reports of Bvt. Maj. Gen. William W. Averell...August 3–September 23, 1864". In Davis, George B.; Perry, Leslie J.; Kirkley, Joseph W. (eds.). The War of the Rebellion: a Compilation of the Official Records of the Union and Confederate Armies Series I Volume XLIII - Part I - Reports, Correspondence, etc. Washington, DC: Government Printing Office. pp. 493–506. OCLC 427057.
- Averell, William W. (1902). "Report of Brig. Gen. William W. Averell....". In Ainsworth, Fred C.; Kirkley, Joseph W. (eds.). The War of the Rebellion: a Compilation of the Official Records of the Union and Confederate Armies Series I Volume XXXVII - Additions and Corrections. Washington, DC: Government Printing Office. pp. 145–150. OCLC 318422190.
- Bates, Samuel P. (1869). History of Pennsylvania Volunteers, 1861-5: Prepared in Compliance with Acts of the Legislature. Harrisburg, Pennsylvania: B. Singerly, State Printer. OCLC 1887553. Archived from the original on 2023-02-12.
- Breck, E.Y., ed. (1899). Pittsburgh Legal Journal (p.137). Pittsburgh, Pennsylvania: John S. Murray. Archived from the original on 2023-02-12.
- Crook, George (1902). "Reports of Bvt. Maj. Gen. George Crook...July 16–26.....". In Ainsworth, Fred C.; Kirkley, Joseph W. (eds.). The War of the Rebellion: a Compilation of the Official Records of the Union and Confederate Armies Series I Volume XXXVII - Additions and Corrections. Washington, DC: Government Printing Office. pp. 286–288. OCLC 318422190.
- Devin, Thomas C. (1902). "Reports of Bvt. Brig. Gen. Thomas C. Devin...July 4–October 21, 1864". In Ainsworth, Fred C.; Kirkley, Joseph W. (eds.). The War of the Rebellion: a Compilation of the Official Records of the Union and Confederate Armies Series I Volume XLIII - Additions and Corrections. Washington, DC: Government Printing Office. pp. 470–484. OCLC 427057.
- Duncan, Richard R. (1998). Lee's Endangered Left: The Civil War in Western Virginia, Spring of 1864. Baton Rouge, Louisiana: Louisiana State University Press. OCLC 940541407.
- Early, Jubal A.; Early, Ruth H. (1912). Lieutenant General Jubal Anderson Early, C.S.A. Autobiographical Sketch and Narrative of the War Between the States. Philadelphia, Pennsylvania: J.B. Lippincott Co. OCLC 1370161. Archived from the original on 2023-02-12.
- Farrar, Samuel Clarke (1911). The Twenty-Second Pennsylvania Cavalry and the Ringgold Battalion. Pittsburgh, Pennsylvania: New Werner Company. OCLC 1018148044. Archived from the original on 2023-02-12.
- Gibson, Thomas (1894). "Report of Major Thomas Gibson....". In Davis, George B.; Perry, Leslie J.; Kirkley, Joseph W. (eds.). The War of the Rebellion: a Compilation of the Official Records of the Union and Confederate Armies Series I Volume XLVI - Part I - Reports. Washington, DC: Government Printing Office. pp. 463–467. OCLC 12241509.
- Kelley, Benjamin F. (1890). "Report of Brig. Gen. Benjamin F. Kelley....". In Scott, Robert N. (ed.). The War of the Rebellion: a Compilation of the Official Records of the Union and Confederate Armies Series I Volume XXIX - Part I - Reports. Washington, DC: Government Printing Office. pp. 499–502. OCLC 318422190.
- Kelley, Benjamin F. (1890a). "Report of Brig. Gen. Benjamin F. Kelley....". In Scott, Robert N. (ed.). The War of the Rebellion: a Compilation of the Official Records of the Union and Confederate Armies Series I Volume XXIX - Part I - Reports. Washington, DC: Government Printing Office. pp. 920–923. OCLC 318422190.
- Kelley, Benjamin F. (1902). "Report of Bvt. Maj. Gen. Benjamin F. Kelley....". In Ainsworth, Fred C.; Kirkley, Joseph W. (eds.). The War of the Rebellion: a Compilation of the Official Records of the Union and Confederate Armies Series I Volume XLIII - Additions and Corrections. Washington, DC: Government Printing Office. pp. 2–3. OCLC 427057.
- Lowry, Terry (1996). Last Sleep: The Battle of Droop Mountain, November 6, 1863. Charleston, West Virginia: Pictorial Histories Publishing Company. ISBN 978-1-57510-024-1. OCLC 36488613.
- Mowrer, George H. (1899). History of the Organization and Service, During the War of the Rebellion, of Company A, 14th Pennsylvania Cavalry. Survivor's Association. OCLC 228711541. Archived from the original on 2021-07-09.
- Parsons, E. B. (1902). "General Orders, No. 6". In Ainsworth, Fred C.; Kirkley, Joseph W. (eds.). The War of the Rebellion: A Compilation of the Official Records of the Union and Confederate Armies, Additions and Corrections to Series I Volume XLIII. Washington, DC: Government Printing Office. p. 738. OCLC 427057.
- Patchan, Scott C. (2007). Shenandoah Summer: The 1864 Valley Campaign. Lincoln, NE: University of Nebraska Press. ISBN 978-0-8032-0700-4. OCLC 122563754.
- Pennsylvania General Assembly (1866). Miscellaneous Documents, Read in the Legislature of the Commonwealth of Pennsylvania, during the Session which Commenced at Harrisburg on the 2nd Day of January, 1866 - Vol. II. Harrisburg, Pennsylvania: Singerly & Myers, State Printers. OCLC 228664952. Archived from the original on 2023-02-12.
- Powell, William H. (1902). "Reports of Brig. Gen. William H. Powell...September 24–October 27 and November 12, 1864". In Ainsworth, Fred C.; Kirkley, Joseph W. (eds.). The War of the Rebellion: a Compilation of the Official Records of the Union and Confederate Armies Series I Volume XLIII - Additions and Corrections. Washington, DC: Government Printing Office. pp. 506–513. OCLC 427057.
- Reader, Frank S. (1890). History of the Fifth West Virginia Cavalry, Formerly the Second Virginia Infantry, and of Battery G, First West Virginia Light Artillery. New Brighton, Pennsylvania: Daily News, Frank S. Reader, Editor and Proprietor.
- Rumsey, Will (1893). "Special Orders No. 18...November 10, 1864". In Davis, George B.; Perry, Leslie J.; Kirkley, Joseph W. (eds.). The War of the Rebellion: A Compilation of the Official Records of the Union and Confederate Armies Series I Volume XLIII Part II Correspondence, Etc. Washington, DC: Government Printing Office. p. 595. OCLC 12241509. Archived from the original on 2023-02-12.
- Rumsey, Will (1893a). "Corespondence to Maj. T. Gibson...December 7, 1864". In Davis, George B.; Perry, Leslie J.; Kirkley, Joseph W. (eds.). The War of the Rebellion: A Compilation of the Official Records of the Union and Confederate Armies Series I Volume XLIII Part II Correspondence, Etc. Washington, DC: Government Printing Office. p. 753. OCLC 12241509.
- Schoonmaker, James M. (1902). "Correspondence with Capt. Will Rumsey August 14, 1864". In Ainsworth, Fred C.; Kirkley, Joseph W. (eds.). The War of the Rebellion: A Compilation of the Official Records of the Union and Confederate Armies, Additions and Corrections to Series I Volume XLIII. Washington, DC: Government Printing Office. p. 797. OCLC 427057.
- Slease, William Davis; Gancas, Ron (1999) [1915]. The Fourteenth Pennsylvania Cavalry in the Civil War: A History of the Fourteenth Pennsylvania Volunteer Cavalry from its Organization until the Close of the Civil War, 1861-1865. Pittsburgh, Pennsylvania: Soldiers' & Sailors' Memorial Hall and Military Museum. ISBN 978-0-96449-529-6. OCLC 44503009.
- Sutton, Joseph J. (2001) [1892]. History of the Second Regiment, West Virginia Cavalry Volunteers, During the War of the Rebellion. Huntington, WV: Blue Acorn Press. ISBN 978-0-9628866-5-2. OCLC 263148491.
- [Unlisted] (1864). The United States Army and Navy Journal and Gazette of the Regular and Volunteer Forces - Vol. II 1864-65. New York, New York: Publication Office Number 39 Park Row. OCLC 3157857. Archived from the original on 2023-02-12.
- [Unlisted] (1893). "Organization of troops in the Middle Military Division...December 31, 1864". In Davis, George B.; Perry, Leslie J.; Kirkley, Joseph W. (eds.). The War of the Rebellion: a Compilation of the Official Records of the Union and Confederate Armies Series I Volume XLIII - Part II - Correspondence, Etc. Washington, DC: Government Printing Office. pp. 847–857.
- [Unlisted] (1902a). "Composition and losses of the Union Forces June 10–23". In Ainsworth, Fred C.; Kirkley, Joseph W. (eds.). The War of the Rebellion: a Compilation of the Official Records of the Union and Confederate Armies Series I Volume XXXVII - Additions and Corrections. Washington, DC: Government Printing Office. pp. 103–106. OCLC 318422190.
- [Unlisted] (1902b). "Return of Casualties in the Union forces...July 24–25 the Union Forces June 10–23". In Ainsworth, Fred C.; Kirkley, Joseph W. (eds.). The War of the Rebellion: a Compilation of the Official Records of the Union and Confederate Armies Series I Volume XXXVII - Additions and Corrections. Washington, DC: Government Printing Office. pp. 288–290. OCLC 318422190.
- [Unlisted] (1902d). "Return of Casualties in the Union forces commanded by Maj. Gen. Philip H. Sheridan...September 19, 1864". In Ainsworth, Fred C.; Kirkley, Joseph W. (eds.). The War of the Rebellion: a Compilation of the Official Records of the Union and Confederate Armies Series I Volume XLIII - Additions and Corrections. Washington, DC: Government Printing Office. pp. 112–119. OCLC 427057.
- [Unlisted] (1902e). "Return of Casualties in the Union forces commanded by Maj. Gen. Philip H. Sheridan...September 21–22, 1864". In Ainsworth, Fred C.; Kirkley, Joseph W. (eds.). The War of the Rebellion: a Compilation of the Official Records of the Union and Confederate Armies Series I Volume XLIII - Additions and Corrections. Washington, DC: Government Printing Office. pp. 120–124. OCLC 427057.
- [Unlisted] (1902f). "Organization of the Union forces commanded by Maj. Gen. Philip H. Sheridan...October 19, 1864". In Ainsworth, Fred C.; Kirkley, Joseph W. (eds.). The War of the Rebellion: a Compilation of the Official Records of the Union and Confederate Armies Series I Volume XLIII - Additions and Corrections. Washington, DC: Government Printing Office. pp. 125–130. OCLC 427057.
- [Unlisted] (1902g). "Return of Casualties in the Union forces commanded by Maj. Gen. Philip H. Sheridan...October 19, 1864". In Ainsworth, Fred C.; Kirkley, Joseph W. (eds.). The War of the Rebellion: a Compilation of the Official Records of the Union and Confederate Armies Series I Volume XLIII - Additions and Corrections. Washington, DC: Government Printing Office. pp. 131–139. OCLC 427057.
- [Unlisted] (1908). The Union Army; A History of Military Affairs in the Loyal States, 1861-65 — Records of the Regiments in the Union Army — Cyclopedia of Battles — Memoirs of Commanders and Soldiers — Volume I. Madison, Wisconsin: Federal Publishing Company. OCLC 1473658. Archived from the original on 2023-02-12.
- Whisonant, Robert C. (2015). Arming the Confederacy : How Virginia's Minerals Forged the Rebel War Machine. Cham, Switzerland: Springer International Publishing. ISBN 978-3-319-14508-2. OCLC 903929889.
- Wittenberg, Eric J.; Petruzzi, J. David; Nugent, Michael F. (2008). One Continuous Fight: the Retreat from Gettysburg and the Pursuit of Lee's Army of Northern Virginia, July 4–14, 1863. New York: Savas Beatie. ISBN 978-1-9327144-3-2. OCLC 185031178.
- Wittenberg, Eric J. (2011). The Battle of White Sulphur Springs: Averell Fails to Secure West Virginia. Charleston, South Carolina: History Press. ISBN 978-1-61423-326-8. OCLC 795566215.
