= Averell's Salem Raid =

1863 cavalry raid of the American Civil War

Date	December 16, 1863
Location	Salem, Virginia 37°46′18.42″N 79°57′59.7″W
Result	Union successful raid

Belligerents
Union Cavalry	Confederate Department of Western Virginia

Commanders and leaders
MG Benjamin F. Kelley; BG William W. Averell	MG Samuel Jones; BG John Echols

Units involved
2nd W.Virginia Mtd Infantry; 3rd W.Virginia Mtd Infantry; 8th W.Virginia Mtd Infantry; 14th Pennsylvania Cavalry; Gibson's Indep. Cavalry; Ewing's Battery; Col. Thoburn's Infantry; Jessie Scouts	19th Virginia Cavalry; Scattered Confederate forces

Strength
2,500	

Casualties and losses
7 drowned 7 wounded 1 missing 130 captured	
- Location within Virginia

Averell's Salem Raid, also called the Salem Winter Raid, was a cavalry raid in the American Civil War on December 16, 1863 in Salem, Virginia.

On December 5, 1863, Brig. Gen. Benjamin Kelley, commander of the Department of Western Virginia ordered Brig. Gen. William Averell to destroy bridges, water stations and depots on the Virginia and Tennessee Railroad. After putting together a complicated plan of deceptive feints with Kelley, Averell left Cumberland, Maryland on December 8.

From December 9-12, Averell's command would slowly move towards Salem, Virginia on back roads and fighting the cold and rain. On December 12 elements of the brigade would encounter pickets of the 19th Virginia Cavalry under Col. William Jackson. On December 13, they would skirmish with a patrol left by Jackson to act as a warning.

Confederate forces would not be able to converge on the brigade as they were responding to multiple attacks made by other brigades under Kelley. Averell would push his troopers hard despite rain and only getting short rests over December 14-15 and on the morning of December 16, they would be only four miles from Salem. Hearing the trains in the distance, Averell would take 350 troopers and two 3-inch guns and gallop into Salem.

Upon arriving in the town, the union troops cut the telegraph lines and tore up the railroad tracks. And only minutes after they arrived, a train loaded with Confederate troops approached. They fired their guns upon the train which quickly reversed back down the tracks.

When the rest of the brigade arrived, the troopers set fire to five bridges and destroyed train tracks. They set supplies, the rail turntable and the depot on fire as well. That afternoon, they left Salem moving south. The brigade made a dangerous crossing at the swollen Craig's Creek, but they force marched all day December 17 and arrived safely to Union lines in New Castle on December 18.

Averell's entire brigade would be given new uniforms to replace the ones they had, which were nearly rags by the end of the raid.

== Battle marker ==
There is a historic marker erected by the Virginia Civil War Trails near Covington, Virginia on Mall Road 0.2 miles east of Horse Mountain View (Virginia Route 648) showing the site of the battle.
