= 37th Virginia Cavalry Battalion =

- Flag of Virginia, 1861
- Active: August 1862 – April 1865
- Disbanded: April 1865
- Allegiance: Confederate States of America
- Branch: Confederate States Army
- Type: Cavalry
- Nickname(s): Dunn's Rangers
- Engagements: American Civil War: Jones-Imboden Raid; Battle of White Sulphur Springs; Siege of Knoxville; Valley Campaigns of 1864; Battle of Moorefield; Third Battle of Winchester

The 37th Virginia Cavalry Battalion was a cavalry battalion raised in Virginia for service in the Confederate States Army during the American Civil War. It fought mostly in western Virginia and the Shenandoah Valley.

== Service ==
Virginia's 37th Cavalry Battalion was organized in August, 1862, as Dunn's Partisan Rangers. The battalion contained four companies and in November was changed to regular cavalry. Co. E was organized on October 1, 1862. Co. F, from North Carolina, was organized on October 26, 1862. Co. H was organized on January 8, 1863, Co. G was organized February 6, 1863, and Co. I was organized on April 1, 1863. Co. K transferred from the 21st Virginia Cavalry before June 5, 1864. It was assigned to W.E. Jones', McCausland's and W.L. Jackson's Brigade. During April, 1864, it totalled 300 effectives and by June had increased its strength to ten companies. It was involved in various operations in western Virginia and East Tennessee, then saw action in the Shenandoah Valley. The unit disbanded in mid-April, 1865. Lieutenant Colonel Ambrose C. Dunn and Major J.R. Claiborne were in command.

== Notable Members ==
- Two sons of Chang and Eng Bunker served with the battalion: Christopher (Chang) was captured at the Battle of Moorefield and imprisoned at Camp Chase, while Stephen (Eng) was severely wounded at the Third Battle of Winchester.

== See also ==
- List of Virginia Civil War units
- List of West Virginia Civil War Confederate units
