= Thomas R. Kerr =

US Army officer and Medal of Honor recipient (1843–1926)

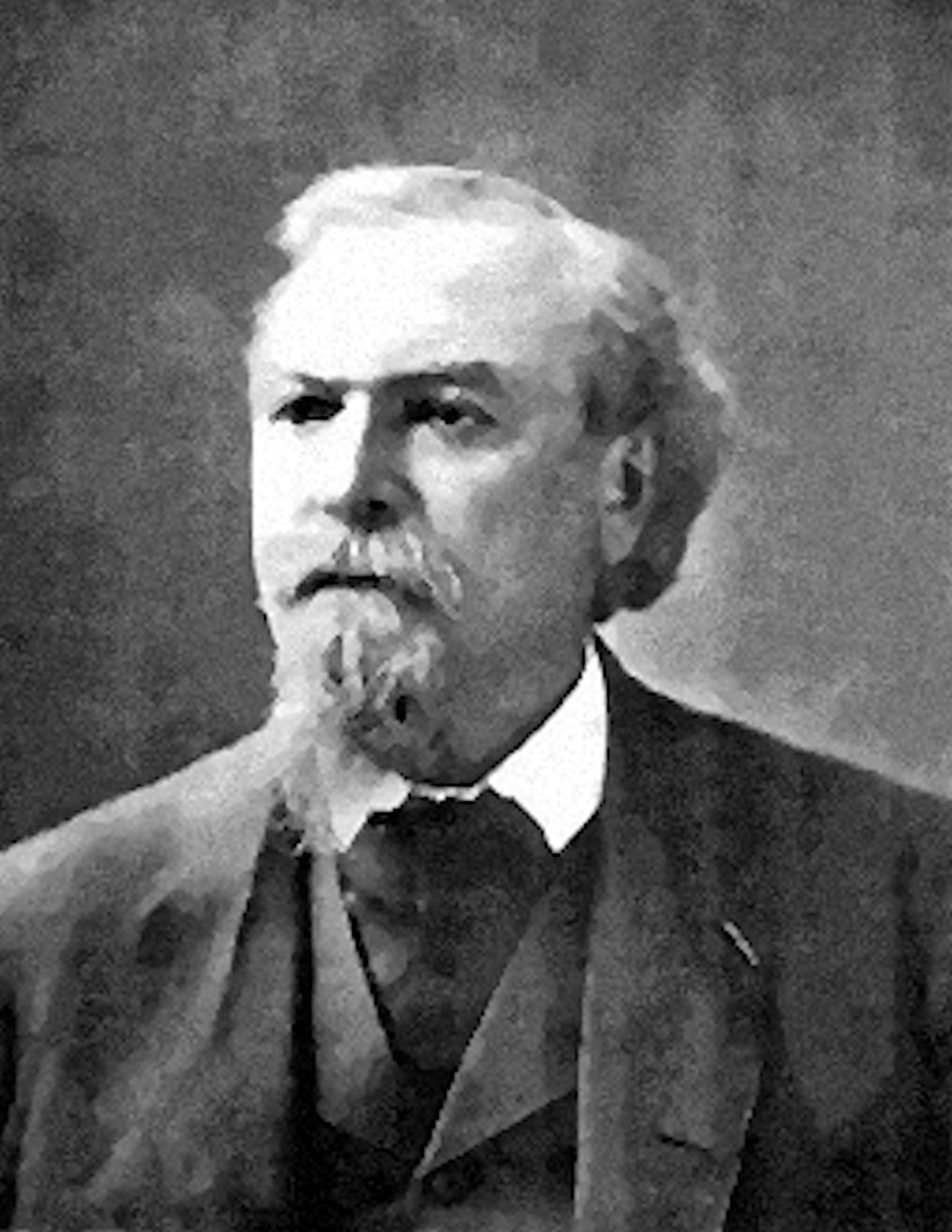
- Born: April 24, 1843; Coleraine, County Londonderry, Ireland
- Died: November 14, 1926 (aged 83)
- Burial place: Arlington National Cemetery, Virginia
- Military career
- Allegiance: United States of America
- Branch: United States Army
- Service years: 1862–1865
- Rank: Captain
- Units: Company C, 14th Pennsylvania Cavalry
- Conflicts: American Civil War: Battle of Moorefield
- Awards: Medal of Honor

Thomas R. Kerr (April 24, 1843 – November 14, 1926) was a soldier in the 14th Pennsylvania Cavalry Regiment of the Union Army in the American Civil War. Kerr received his country's highest award for bravery during combat, the Medal of Honor. Kerr's medal was won for his capturing the flag of the Confederate 8th Virginia Cavalry Regiment in the Battle of Moorefield that occurred in West Virginia on August 7, 1864. He was honored with the award on June 13, 1894.

== Medal of Honor citation ==
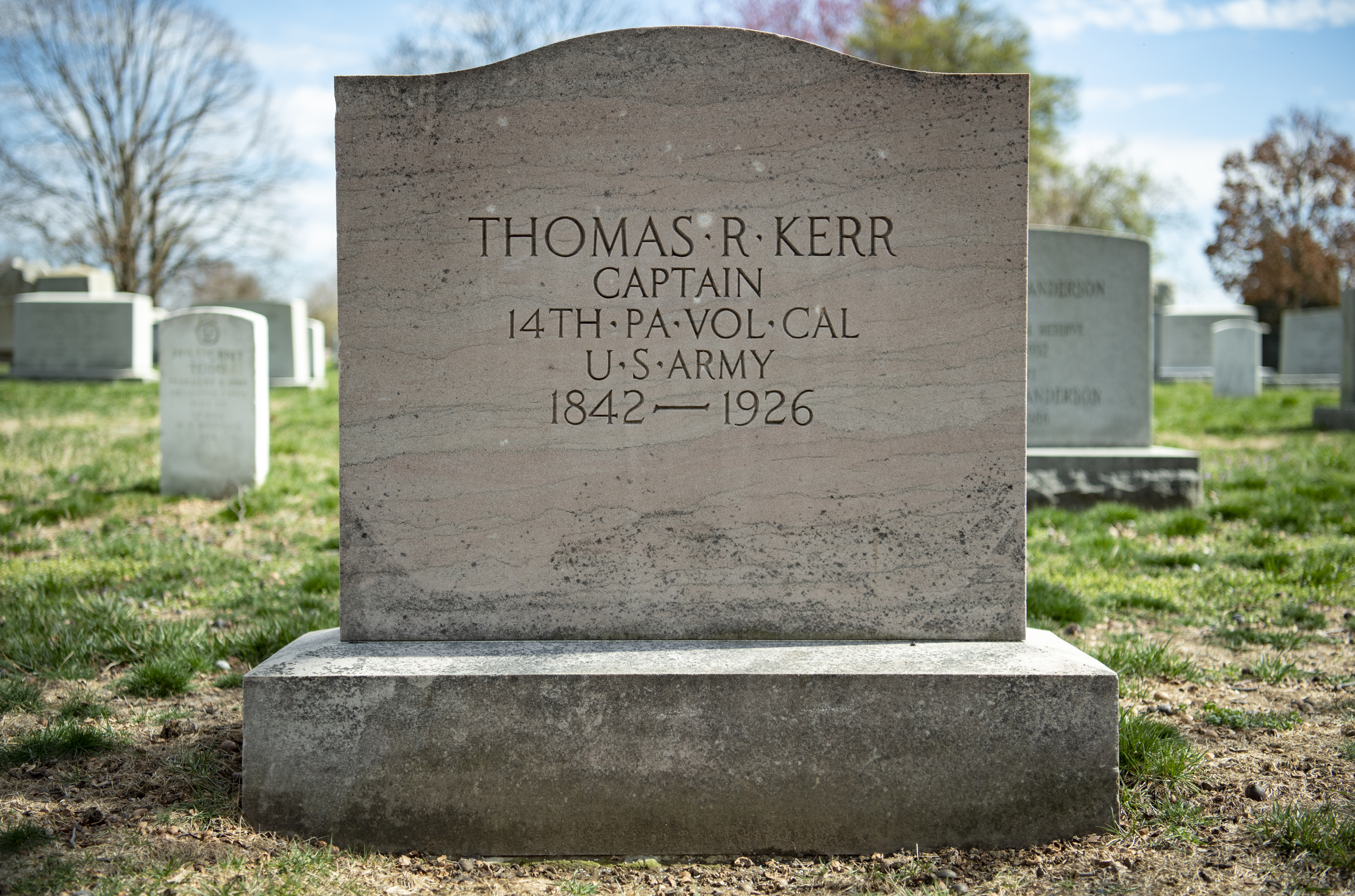
Grave at Arlington National Cemetery

The President of the United States of America, in the name of Congress, takes pleasure in presenting the Medal of Honor to Captain (Cavalry) Thomas R. Kerr, United States Army, for extraordinary heroism on 7 August 1864, while serving with Company C, 14th Pennsylvania Cavalry, in action at Moorefield, West Virginia. After being most desperately wounded, Captain Kerr captured the colors of the 8th Virginia Cavalry (Confederate States of America).

== Background ==
Kerr was born in Coleraine, County Londonderry, Ireland. He was commissioned as a second lieutenant with the 14th Pennsylvania Cavalry in November 1862. He was promoted to captain in May 1864 and resigned in June 1865. Kerr is buried at Arlington National Cemetery, in Arlington, Virginia.

== Battle ==
Kerr earned his medal in the Battle of Moorefield on August 7, 1864. The battle occurred in a portion of West Virginia that was hostile to the Union during the American Civil War. Kerr led a group of 60 men, disguised as Confederate soldiers, into a Confederate camp early in the morning. Two Union brigades under the command of Brigadier General William W. Averell followed, and the Union force surprised and routed a larger Confederate cavalry force that had burned the Pennsylvania town of Chambersburg only a week earlier. (Note: Two brigades of Confederate cavalry, led by Brigadier General John McCausland, burned the town of Chambersburg, Pennsylvania, after the town refused to pay a ransom. Over 550 buildings were destroyed and 2,000 people became homeless.) Kerr was shot in the face and thigh, and his horse killed—yet he captured the flag of the 8th Virginia Cavalry Regiment and rode away on the color bearer's horse. Averell's small division captured 27 officers and 393 enlisted men, 4 artillery pieces, and 400 horses. The Confederate killed and wounded was unknown. Union losses were 7 killed and 21 wounded. A Union soldier that fought in the battle estimated that the "loss to the enemy in killed, wounded and captured was near eight hundred". The loss severely damaged Confederate cavalry in the Shenandoah Valley.

== See also ==
- List of American Civil War Medal of Honor recipients: G–L

== Notes ==
=== References ===
- Ainsworth, Fred C.; Kirkley, Joseph W., eds. (1902). The War of the Rebellion: A Compilation of the Official Records of the Union and Confederate Armies, Additions and Corrections to Series I Volume XLIII Part 1. Washington, DC: Government Printing Office. OCLC 427057.
- Slease, William Davis; Gancas, Ron (1999) [1915]. The Fourteenth Pennsylvania Cavalry in the Civil War: A History of the Fourteenth Pennsylvania Volunteer Cavalry from its Organization until the Close of the Civil War, 1861-1865. Pittsburgh, Pennsylvania: Soldiers' & Sailors' Memorial Hall and Military Museum. ISBN 978-0-96449-529-6. OCLC 44503009.
- Sutton, Joseph J. (2001) [1892]. History of the Second Regiment, West Virginia Cavalry Volunteers, During the War of the Rebellion. Huntington, WV: Blue Acorn Press. ISBN 978-0-9628866-5-2. OCLC 263148491.
