= James Martinus Schoonmaker =

American Union Army colonel and railroad executive

James Martinus Schoonmaker Sr.
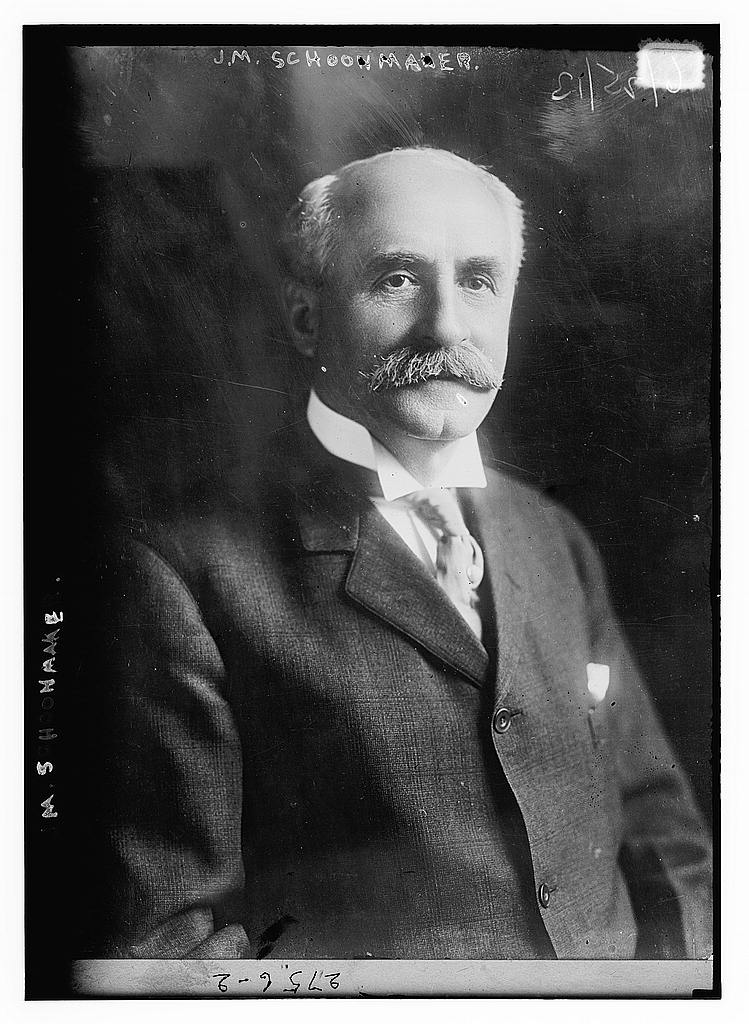
- James Martinus Schoonmaker circa 1913
- Born: June 30, 1842; Pittsburgh, Pennsylvania, US
- Died: October 11, 1927 (aged 85); Pittsburgh, Pennsylvania, US
- Burial place: Homewood Cemetery, Pittsburgh, Pennsylvania
- Military career
- Allegiance: United States of America; Union
- Branch: Union Army
- Service years: 1861 - 1865
- Rank: Colonel
- Commands: 14th Pennsylvania Cavalry
- Conflicts: American Civil War • Third Battle of Winchester
- Awards: Medal of Honor
- Other work: Railroad executive

James Martinus Schoonmaker Sr. (June 30, 1842 – October 11, 1927) was a colonel in the Union Army in the American Civil War and a vice-president of the Pittsburgh and Lake Erie Railroad. He received the Medal of Honor for gallantry at the Third Battle of Winchester on September 19, 1864.

== Biography ==
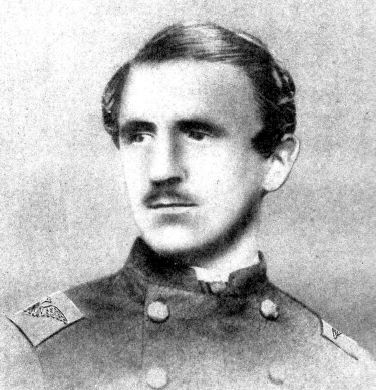
J. M. Schoonmaker in Union uniform

He was born in Peebles Twp. (subsequently Pittsburgh) on June 30, 1842, to James Schoonmaker and Mary Clark Stockton. James was a student at the Western University of Pennsylvania (now known as the University of Pittsburgh) when the American Civil War began and enlisted in a local company of recruits which was assigned to the 1st Maryland Cavalry Regiment, rising to the rank of lieutenant. During the next thirteen months, he proved himself repeatedly in battle and in command of his troops.

In August 1862, Schoonmaker was authorized by Secretary of War Edwin Stanton to raise the 14th Pennsylvania Cavalry Regiment, and was promoted to the rank of colonel. He later also commanded a cavalry brigade in the Cavalry Corps, under the command of Philip Sheridan.

At the Third Battle of Winchester, September 19, 1864, Schoonmaker led his troops in a dismounted charge against Confederate artillery in Fort Alabama (Star Fort). It was for this action he received the Medal of Honor on May 19, 1899. The Medal of Honor citation reads: "During the Battle of Star Fort, Virginia, at a critical period, gallantly led a cavalry charge against the left of the enemy's line of battle, drove the enemy out of his works, and captured many prisoners."

After the war he made a fortune in coke around Pittsburgh and was on the board of directors at Mellon Bank. He married Alice Brown and Rebekah Cook and had three children: Gretchen Schoonmaker, William Schoonmaker, and James Martinus Schoonmaker Jr. He died on October 11, 1927, in Pittsburgh. He is buried at Homewood Cemetery in Pittsburgh.

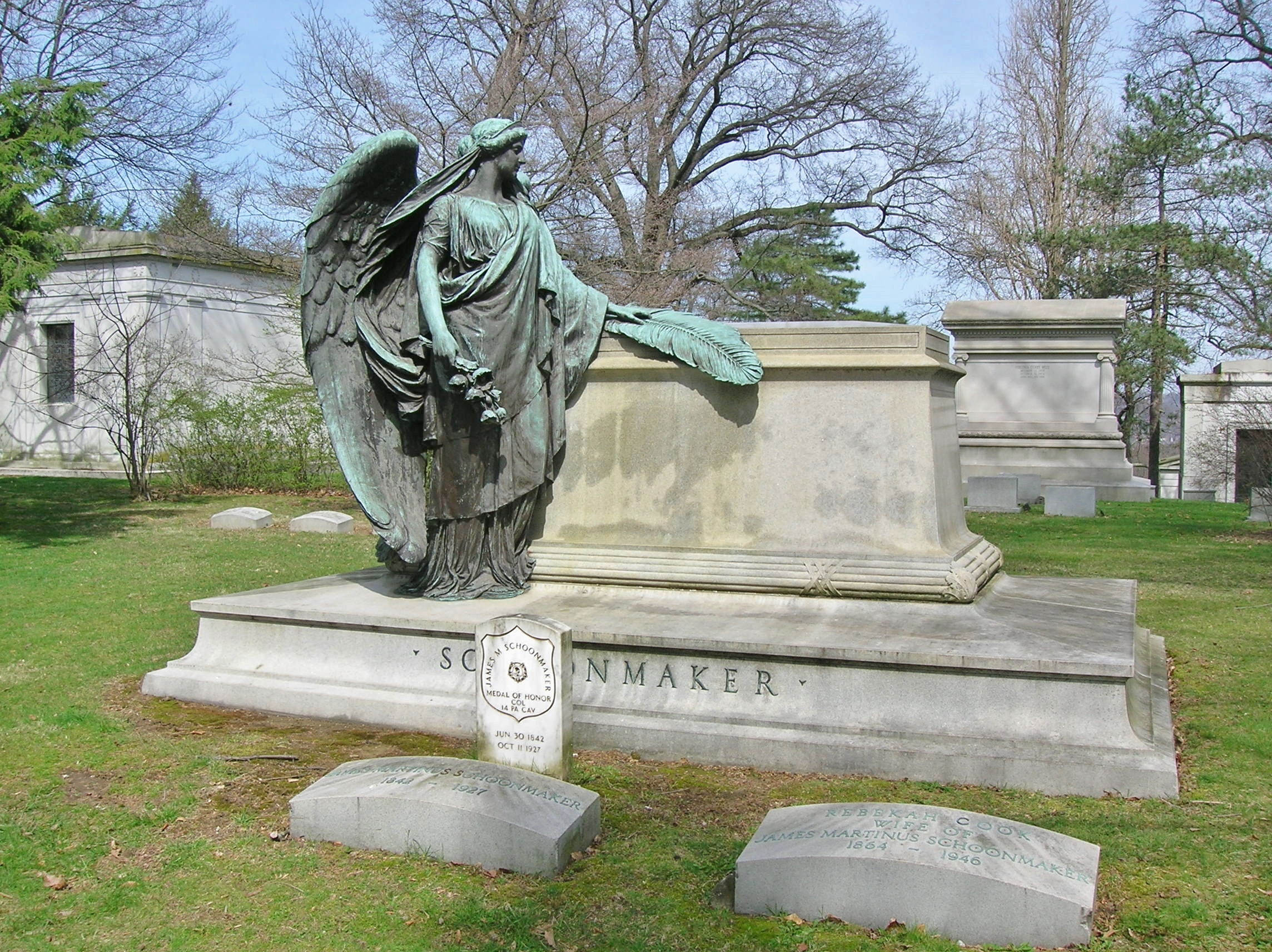
Schoonmaker monument at Homewood Cemetery (Jakob Otto Schweizer, sculptor)

== See also ==
- Col. James M. Schoonmaker (1911 ship), currently a museum ship in Toledo, Ohio
- List of American Civil War Medal of Honor recipients: Q–S
- German Americans in the Civil War
