= 17th Virginia Cavalry Regiment =

- Flag of Virginia, 1861
- Active: January 1863 – April 1865
- Disbanded: April 1865
- Country: Confederacy
- Allegiance: Confederate States of America
- Branch: Confederate States Army
- Type: Cavalry
- Role: Cavalry
- Engagements: Battle of Gettysburg; Battle of Cloyd's Mountain; Valley Campaigns of 1864 * Battle of Moorefield; Battle of Five Forks

The 17th Virginia Cavalry Regiment was a cavalry regiment raised in Virginia for service in the Confederate States Army during the American Civil War. It fought with the Army of Northern Virginia, in southwestern Virginia, and in the Shenandoah Valley.

Virginia's 17th Cavalry Regiment was organized at Salem, Virginia, on January 28, 1863, by consolidating the 33rd Battalion Virginia Cavalry with three new companies. The men were recruited primarily in the counties that became West Virginia; Mercer, Nicholas, Jackson, Braxton, Wood, Lewis, Harrison, Roane, Wirt, Pocahontas, Monroe, and Giles County, Virginia.

They were first sent to southwestern Virginia and adjoining areas of Tennessee and later assigned to Jenkins' and McCausland's Brigade. They were active in the Gettysburg Campaign, then returned to western Virginia. The regiment fought at Cloyd's Mountain, was with Early in the Shenandoah Valley, and saw action around Appomattox.

There were 241 engaged at Gettysburg and during February, 1864, it contained 311 effectives. In April, 1865, it disbanded at Lynchburg. The field officers were Colonel William H. French, Lieutenant Colonel William C. Tavenner, and Major Frederick F. Smith.

== See also ==
- List of Virginia Civil War units
- List of West Virginia Civil War Confederate units
