= 22nd Pennsylvania Cavalry Regiment =

Union Army cavalry regiment

74th Pennsylvania Volunteer Infantry 22nd Pennsylvania Cavalry
- Pennsylvania flag
- Active: February 1864 – June 24, 1865
- Country: United States
- Allegiance: Union
- Branch: Cavalry
- Engagements: Battle of Moorefield (det.); Battle of Opequon; Battle of Cedar Creek

The 22nd Pennsylvania Volunteer Cavalry was a cavalry regiment of the Union Army during the American Civil War.

== History ==
The regiment was formed in February 1864, at Chambersburg, Pennsylvania, by the consolidation of two battalions, the Ringgold Cavalry and a battalion raised during the Gettysburg campaign. The seven companies were mostly raised in Washington County. Jacob C. Higgins was selected to serve as colonel, A. J. Greenfield as lieutenant colonel, and George T. Work, Elias S. Troxell, and Henry A. Myers as majors.

The 22nd Pennsylvania Cavalry was sent to Maryland for training, after which it was assigned to the Department of West Virginia. The dismounted men were assigned to the Reserve Division, while the mounted portion of the unit became part of the 2nd Brigade, First Cavalry Division.

A detachment of the regiment, under the command of Major George T. Work, fought in the Battle of Moorefield on August 7, 1864. The regiment fought in several skirmishes during the Lynchburg Campaign and Early's Raid on Washington. In August, it was assigned to the Army of the Shenandoah as part of the 3rd Brigade, Cavalry Corps. It fought in several battles of Sheridan's campaign, such as at the Battle of Opequon and the Battle of Cedar Creek. In December, it was sent back to the Department of West Virginia, where it spent the remainder of the war chasing down guerrillas.

On June 24, 1865, it was consolidated with the 18th Pennsylvania Cavalry to form the 3rd Pennsylvania Provisional Cavalry.

== Casualties ==
- Killed and mortally wounded: 0 officers, 33 enlisted men
- Wounded: ? officers, ? enlisted men
- Captured or missing: ? officers, ? enlisted men
- Died of disease: 1 officer, 96 enlisted men
- Total: ? officers, ? enlisted men

== See also ==
- List of Pennsylvania Civil War units
