= 21st Virginia Cavalry Regiment =

- Flag of Virginia, 1861
- Active: August 1863 – April 1865
- Disbanded: April 1865
- Country: Confederacy
- Allegiance: Confederate States of America
- Branch: Confederate States Army
- Type: Cavalry
- Engagements: Valley Campaigns of 1864; Battle of Five Forks

The 21st Virginia Cavalry Regiment was a cavalry regiment raised in Virginia for service in the Confederate States Army during the American Civil War. It fought in Southwest Virginia, East Tennessee, and the Shenandoah Valley.

Virginia's 21st Cavalry Regiment was organized in August, 1863, with companies which had served in the Virginia State Line. The unit was assigned to W.E. Jones' and McCausland's Brigade, and in April, 1864, it contained 317 effectives. It took an active part in various conflicts in East Tennessee, western Virginia, and in the Shenandoah Valley. During mid-April, 1865, the regiment disbanded. Its field officers were Colonel W.E. Peters, Lieutenant Colonel David Edmundson, and Major Stephen P. Halsey.

== See also ==
- List of Virginia Civil War units
- List of West Virginia Civil War Confederate units
