= William W. Averell =

American general and diplomat (1832–1900)

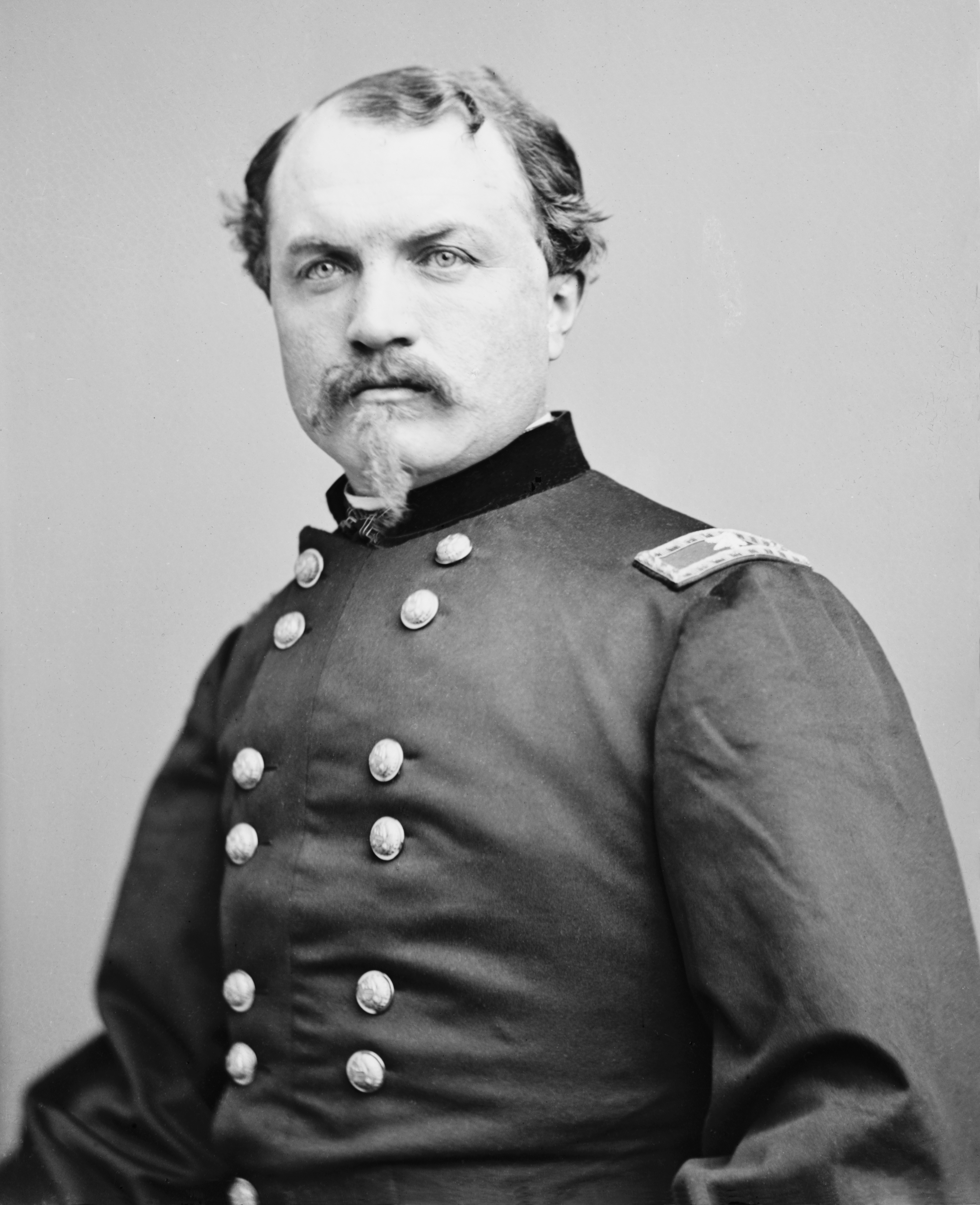
- Averell, 1861–1865
- Born: William Woods Averell; November 5, 1832; Cameron, New York, U.S.
- Died: February 3, 1900 (aged 67); Bath, New York, U.S.
- Military career
- Allegiance: United States of America; Union
- Branch: United States Army; Union Army
- Service years: 1855–1865
- Rank: Brevet Major General
- Commands: 3rd Pennsylvania Cavalry
- Conflicts: Indian Wars; American Civil War; First Battle of Bull Run; Peninsula Campaign; Seven Days Battles; Battle of Fredericksburg; Battle of Kelly's Ford; Averell's Salem Raid; Battle of Chancellorsville; Battle of Droop Mountain; Battle of Cove Mountain; Battle of Lynchburg; Battle of Rutherford's Farm; Battle of Moorefield; Third Battle of Winchester; Battle of Fisher's Hill
- Other work: U.S. Consul General; Inventor

William Woods Averell (November 5, 1832 – February 3, 1900) was a career United States Army officer and a cavalry general in the American Civil War. He was the only Union general to achieve a major victory against the Confederates in the Valley Campaigns of 1864 prior to the arrival of Philip Sheridan, at the Battle of Rutherford's (Carter's) Farm and at the Battle of Moorefield.

After the war, Averell was appointed by President Andrew Johnson as a diplomat to British North America, serving 1866 to 1869. Also an entrepreneur and inventor with interests in the coal, steel and related infrastructure industry, Averell became wealthy by inventing an improved technique for laying asphalt pavement.

He co-wrote a history of the Third Pennsylvania Cavalry, Sixtieth Regiment Pennsylvania Volunteers during the Civil War years; it was published in 1905. He wrote a memoir of his Army years from 1851 to 1862 but did not publish it and the manuscript was lost for a time. It was discovered in the late 20th century and published in an annotated edition in 1978.

== Early years ==
Averell was born in Cameron, New York. As a boy, he worked as a drugstore clerk in the nearby town of Bath.

He graduated from the United States Military Academy at West Point in 1855 and was commissioned a second lieutenant in the U.S. Army Mounted Rifles. His early assignments included garrison duty at Jefferson Barracks, Missouri, and the U.S. Army Cavalry School in Carlisle, Pennsylvania. During two years of service in New Mexico, he was wounded in action against the Indians in October 1858, and was placed on the disabled list until the outbreak of the Civil War.

== Civil War ==
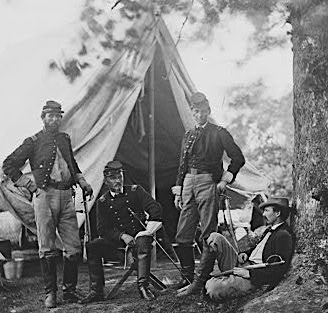
Col. William W. Averell (sitting) of 3rd Pennsylvania Cavalry with staff in August 1862

After the capture of Fort Sumter, Lt. Averell made a risky solo journey across the country to the Indian Territory with a message to summon his old mounted rifle regiment to the East to join the fighting.

Averell first saw action at the First Battle of Bull Run while acting as assistant adjutant general to Brig. Gen. Andrew Porter. In August 1861, he was appointed colonel of the 3rd Pennsylvania Cavalry regiment, which he led through the Peninsula Campaign and the Seven Days Battles. Immediately after that campaign, on July 6, 1862, he was given command of the 1st Cavalry Brigade in the Army of the Potomac. He missed the Battle of Antietam and most of the Maryland Campaign as he recovered from a bout of malaria; this was known at the time as "Chickahominy Fever".

As Confederate Maj. Gen. J.E.B. Stuart's cavalry rode around the Union Army and raided Chambersburg, Pennsylvania, Averell returned in time to lead his brigade in pursuit. President Abraham Lincoln appointed Averell a brigadier general of volunteers on September 26, 1862, to rank from that date. Lincoln had to nominate Averell three times before the U.S. Senate confirmed the appointment on March 11, 1863.

During the Battle of Fredericksburg, Averell commanded the Cavalry Brigade of the Center Grand Division of the Army of the Potomac. He ascended to division command—the 2nd division of the Cavalry Corps—on February 12, 1863. His division fought the Battle of Kelly's Ford on March 17, 1863, notable as the first engagement in which Union cavalrymen claimed victory against their Confederate counterparts. But the 2nd Division's reputation was diminished as it participated in Maj. Gen. George Stoneman's fruitless cavalry raid in the Battle of Chancellorsville six weeks later. On May 2, 1863, Union Army commander Maj. Gen. Joseph Hooker relieved Averell of his command due to his slow performance during the raid. Hooker subsequently sent a report to the Adjutant General that said: "General Averell's command numbered about 4,000 sabers and a light battery, a larger cavalry force than can be found in the rebel army between Fredericksburg and Richmond, and yet that officer seems to have contented himself between April 29th, and May 4th, with having marched through Culpeper to Rapidan, a distance of twenty-eight miles, meeting no enemy deserving the name, and from that point reporting to me for instructions."

Averell left the Army of the Potomac after his relief at Chancellorsville. He fought a series of minor engagements in the Department of West Virginia at the brigade and division level. In November 1863, he conducted what is called Averell's West Virginia Raid against the Virginia and Tennessee Railroad. He received a brevet promotion to lieutenant colonel in the regular army for the Battle of Droop Mountain in West Virginia on November 6, 1863, and to colonel for actions at Salem, Virginia, on December 15, 1863. In the spring of 1864, he led another cavalry raid toward Saltville but was stopped by Confederate generals John Hunt Morgan and William E. "Grumble" Jones at Cove Gap in the Battle of Cove Mountain. Returning to West Virginia, Averell later commanded a cavalry division under Maj. Gen. David Hunter in his failed raid on Lynchburg, known as the Battle of Lynchburg.

In the summer of 1864, when CSA Lt. Gen. Jubal Early had invaded Maryland and defeated a series of Union commanders, Averell proved to be the only Union commander to achieve victory against the Confederates in the Shenandoah Valley before the arrival of Philip Sheridan. He routed Confederate Maj. Gen. Stephen D. Ramseur at the Battle of Rutherford's (Carter's) Farm on July 20, 1864, inflicting 400 casualties and capturing a four-gun battery, in spite of Averell's being significantly outnumbered. When CSA Brig. Gen. John McCausland burned Chambersburg, Pennsylvania, to the ground on July 30, Averell tracked him down near Moorefield, West Virginia.

Using scouts disguised as Confederates in his vanguard, Averell routed McCausland in a sunrise attack upon the Confederate camp, capturing hundreds of prisoners and another four-gun battery in the Battle of Moorefield.

During the Valley Campaigns of 1864 against Early, Averell fought under Maj. Gen. Philip Sheridan. He was relieved of command a second time in his career on September 23, 1864, following a dispute with Sheridan about Averell's actions after the Battle of Fisher's Hill. This incident truly devastated him and he could not hide his misery. A staff officer wrote "I saw General Averell sitting in front of his tent ... He was dreadfully depressed and broken. I believe he started for the rear within a few moments after we left him, and never was employed again during the war." Averell resigned from the Union Army volunteers and from the U.S. regular army on May 18, 1865.

On July 17, 1866, President Andrew Johnson nominated Averell for appointment to the grades of brevet brigadier general and brevet major general in the regular army, to rank from March 13, 1865. The U.S. Senate confirmed the appointments on July 23, 1866. The latter appointment was in recognition of Averell's actions at the Battle of Kelly's Ford.

== Postbellum career ==
Following the Civil War, President Johnson appointed Averell as U.S. consul general to British North America; he served from 1866 to 1869, through the rest of that administration. In 1888, during Grover Cleveland's presidency, Averell was reinstated in the Army by a special Act of Congress and placed upon the retired list; he was also appointed as Assistant Inspector General of Soldiers Homes (1888-1898).

Averell was an entrepreneur and an inventor, working in the fields of coal, steel and eventually paving materials. His businesses and his inventions of practical devices generated a handsome income. Among his inventions were methods for manufacturing steel castings and insulated electrical cable, but he is best known for his work in techniques of laying asphalt pavement. Averell had become interested in asphalt as early as 1870, when some experimental pavement, based on the procedures patented by Edward de Smedt, a Belgian engineer and chemist, was laid in New York City and Newark, New Jersey. Although Averell observed problems with these installations, he was convinced of the potential of asphalt paving. As president of the Grahamite Asphalt Pavement Company, he began studying the existing product and procedures and experimenting with ways to improve them. Eventually, he developed improved techniques for laying pavement, which he patented in 1878 as "Improvement in Asphaltic Pavement."

Averell was among career officers who wrote memoirs and histories of military units: he wrote Ten Years in the Saddle (1978) and co-authored History of the Third Pennsylvania Cavalry, 60th Regiment Pennsylvania Volunteers (1905). Both books were published posthumously. The manuscript for his memoir was not discovered until the later 20th century, and it was published in an annotated edition.

== Death, legacy and honors ==
General Averell died in Bath, New York, and is buried there.

- In 1976, Averell was one of the first class of ten inductees for the Steuben County (NY) Hall of Fame.
- Averell Street in Winchester, Virginia, to mark the area where his former troops went into winter quarters in 1864.

== See also ==
- List of American Civil War generals (Union)
