= James Campbell =

James Campbell may refer to:

== Academics ==
- James Archibald Campbell (1862–1934), founder of Campbell University in North Carolina
- James Marshall Campbell (1895–1977), dean of the college of arts and sciences at the Catholic University of America
- James Campbell (historian) (1935–2016), British academic specialising in Anglo-Saxon studies
- James E. Campbell (academic), American political scientist

== Business ==
- James Campbell (industrialist) (1826–1900), Hawaii industrialist
- James Campbell (timber merchant) (1830–1904), Australian timber merchant
- James Dykes Campbell (1839–1895), Scottish merchant and writer
- James Anson Campbell (1854–1933), American businessman with Youngstown Sheet and Tube Company
- James P. Campbell (fl. 2000s), president and CEO of GE Consumer & Industrial

== Entertainment ==
- James Campbell (artist) (1828–1893), English artist
- James Edwin Campbell (poet) (1867–1896), African-American poet, editor, writer and educator
- Blind James Campbell (1906–1981), American blues singer and guitarist
- James Campbell (clarinetist) (born 1949), Canadian/American clarinetist
- James Campbell (author) (born 1951), Scottish writer
- James Campbell (comedian), children's comedian in the UK
- James B. Campbell (born 1953), percussionist, author
- Jim Campbell (comics) (born 1977), U.S. comics artist
- J. Kenneth Campbell (born 1947), American actor

== Military ==
- James Campbell, 1st Earl of Irvine, Lord Kintyre (1610–1645), colonel of the Garde Écossaise and son of Archibald Campbell, 7th Earl of Argyll
- James Campbell (officer of arms), Lord Lyon King of Arms, 1658–1660
- James Campbell (British Army officer, died 1745) (c. 1680–1745), Scottish officer of the British Army
- James Campbell (British Army officer, died 1831) (1745–1831), British Army officer
- James Campbell (land commissioner) (1787–1858), British Army officer and Commissioner of Crown Lands in Canterbury, New Zealand
- James Campbell (Royal Marines officer) (1761–1840)
- Sir James Campbell, 1st Baronet (1763–1819), British Army officer
- James A. Campbell (Medal of Honor) (1844–1904), American Civil War soldier
- James L. Campbell (born 1949), American soldier

== Politics ==
=== Australia ===
- James Campbell (New South Wales politician) (1820–1879), member of the NSW Legislative Assembly 1864–1874 for Morpeth
- James Campbell (Queensland politician) (1838–1925), member of the Queensland Legislative Assembly
- James Callender Campbell (1838–1916), member of the Victorian Legislative Council (South Eastern) 1895–1910
- James Campbell (Victorian politician) (1845–1893), member of the Victorian Legislative Council (Wellington) 1882–1886, Assembly 1982–93

=== U.K. ===
- James Cambell (1570–1642), ironmonger and Lord Mayor of London
- James Campbell (of Burnbank and Boquhan) (c. 1660–c. 1713), MP for Ayr Burghs
- Sir James Campbell, 2nd Baronet, of Ardkinglass (1666–1752), British MP for Argyllshire and Stirlingshire
- James Campbell (1737–1805), Scottish MP for Stirling Burghs
- James Campbell of Stracathro (1790–1876) Scottish businessman and politician
- James Alexander Campbell (politician) (1825–1908), Scottish MP for Glasgow and Aberdeen Universities and privy councillor
- James Campbell, 1st Baron Glenavy (1851–1931), Irish solicitor-general, attorney-general and lord chancellor
- James Campbell (British Army officer, died 1835) (c. 1773–1835), governor of British Ceylon, 1822–1824

=== U.S. ===
- James Campbell (postmaster general) (1812–1893), US postmaster general
- James Campbell (Wisconsin politician) (1814–1883), member of the Wisconsin State Assembly
- James E. Campbell (1843–1924), Democratic politician from Ohio
- James Hepburn Campbell (1820–1895), U.S. representative from Pennsylvania
- James J. Campbell, American politician from Maine
- James M. Campbell, member of the Wisconsin State Assembly
- James R. Campbell (Illinois politician) (1853–1924), U.S. representative from Illinois
- James R. Campbell (Arkansas politician) (1893–1981), member of the Arkansas House of Representatives
- James U. Campbell (1866–1937), chief justice of the Oregon Supreme Court
- James V. Campbell (1823–1890), member of the Michigan Supreme Court from 1858 to 1890
- James W. Campbell (born 1947), member of the Maryland House of Delegates

== Sports ==
- James Campbell (English cricketer) (born 1988), English cricketer
- James Campbell (English footballer) (fl. 1910/11), English goalkeeper (Huddersfield Town)
- James Campbell (footballer, born 1869) (1869–1938), Scottish footballer (Kilmarnock FC and Scotland)
- James Campbell (javelin thrower) (born 1988), Scottish javelin thrower
- James Campbell (New Zealand cricketer) (fl. 1868/69), New Zealand cricketer
- James Campbell (rugby union) (1858–1902), Canadian rugby player
- James Campbell (pole vaulter) (1901–1975), British Olympic athlete

== Other ==
- James Campbell of Lawers (died 1645), Scottish landowner
- James Campbell (surgeon), 19th-century British surgeon, member of the Jones-Brydges mission to Iran
- James Colquhoun Campbell (1813–1895), Scottish-born Welsh Anglican Bishop of Bangor
- James G. Campbell (1811–1868), justice of the Louisiana Supreme Court
- James Macnabb Campbell (1846–1903), Scottish administrator and ethnologist in India
- James Palmer Campbell (1855–1926), member of the New Zealand Legislative Council
- James Campbell (minister) (1789–1861), Church of Scotland minister
- James Montgomery Campbell (1859–1937), Scottish clergyman
- James T. Campbell, American historian
- James Campbell (journalist) (fl. 2000s), Australian journalist
- James Campbell, 2nd Baronet, of Aberuchil; see Campbell baronets
- James Campbell, pseudonym of James Campbell Reddie (died 1878), author of pornography
- James Campbell (potter) (1943–2019), British potter
- James Campbell and Sons, a building materials company in Brisbane, Queensland, Australia

== See also ==
- Irving King, pseudonym of the British songwriting team of Jimmy (James) Campbell and Reg Connelly
- Jim Campbell (disambiguation)
- Jimmy Campbell (disambiguation)
- Jamie Campbell (disambiguation)
- James Campbell High School
- James Edwin Campbell (disambiguation)
