= Julius Street Flats =

- Location within Queensland Location within Australia
- 27.4683°S 153.0408°E
- Location: 15 Julius Street, New Farm, City of Brisbane, Queensland, Australia

History
- Design period: 1919–1930s (interwar period)
- Built: 1934 – early 1950s

Queensland Heritage Register
- Official name: Julius Street Flats New Farm, Ardrossan, Green Gables, Julius Lodge
- Type: state heritage (built, landscape)
- Designated: 4 August 1997
- Reference no.: 601895
- Significant period: 1930s–1950s early (fabric); 1930s (historical)
- Significant components: terracing, views from, residential accommodation – flat/s, views to, furniture/fittings, driveway, lead light/s, laundry / wash house, pathway/walkway, trees/plantings, fence/wall – perimeter, boat shed, garden/grounds, road/roadway, garage, basement / sub-floor, residential accommodation – caretaker's quarters

Julius Street Flats is a heritage-listed group of seven apartment blocks at 15 Julius Street, New Farm, City of Brisbane, Queensland, Australia. They were built from 1934 to early 1950s. The apartment blocks are called Ardrossan, Green Gables, Julius Lodge (formerly Nanmara), Syncarpia, Ainslie, Pine Lodge (formerly Aloha Court) and Evelyn Court. They were added to the Queensland Heritage Register on 4 August 1997.

== History ==
Julius Street Flats, consisting of seven properties comprising Ardrossan, Green Gables, 5 Julius Street, Syncarpia, Ainslie, Pine Lodge, and Evelyn Court, are located fronting Julius Street, a short cul-de-sac off Moray Street, New Farm. Two of the properties, Evelyn Court and Pine Lodge, have frontage to the Brisbane River. The seven properties were constructed between 1934 and 1938 on a parcel of land subdivided in 1933 by Julius Rosenfeld, who had operated Rosenfeld's Sawmill on the site from c. 1924.

The land on which the properties are located was originally part of a larger parcel for which a Deed of Grant was issued to John McConnel in January 1845. Part of this land, eastern suburban allotments 14 and 15, was later transferred to his brother David Cannon McConnel (1818–1885), an early Queensland pastoralist who in 1841 had established Cressbrook in the Brisbane River Valley, the second run in the Moreton Bay district of New South Wales.

In 1876, the land on which the Julius Street properties are located was transferred to William Henry Barker and Frederick Hamilton Hart, and a Certificate of Title was issued in February of that year.

From June 1876 to December 1878, businessman James Campbell acquired subs 48, 49 and 50 of ESA 15 and sub 51 of ESA 15A. The firm of James Campbell and Sons specialised in building materials including lime, cement, plaster and timber, and operated timber mills, plantations, lime works and pottery kilns in a number of locations in south east Queensland, as well as Campbell's wharf and warehouse at Creek Street, Brisbane. The firm also established a thriving shipping trade with a substantial fleet of freight vessels.

The area surrounding subs 48–51 of ESA 15 and 15A was still largely undeveloped when James Campbell applied to the Brisbane Municipal Council for permission to establish a lime kiln on Bowen Terrace, below Langshaw Street, in 1878. In addition to the kiln, Campbell built a wharf and transported limestone, and later timber, to the site. In 1882 Campbell opened the Langshaw Planing Mills and Joinery Works on the property, and later a second lime kiln was constructed. The remains of lime kilns are located near the river bank below Pine Lodge.

In July 1897 the property was transferred to Thomas Hanmer, who retained it until August 1914, when it was transferred to James Green. A plan titled Campbell's Wharf New Farm, thought to date from 1904, shows lime kilns in ruins with an adjoining iron shed, a retaining wall at the high water mark with a short wharf, and the location of remnants of Campbell's Sawmill.

In January 1924, the property was acquired by Julius Rosenfeld who resumed timber milling on the site. Julius Rosenfeld operated Rosenfeld & Sons saw and planning mills, a subsidiary of Rosenfeld & Company Ltd which was based in Sydney.

A disastrous fire in February 1931 destroyed the mill, and in 1933 Rosenfeld subdivided the land into seven residential allotments surrounding a short cul-de-sac, and two allotments fronting Moray Street. This cul-de-sac was named Julius Street, and was dedicated by the Brisbane City Council in February 1934.

The seven properties fronting Julius Street, and two fronting Moray Street, were transferred as follows: November 1933, resub 4 of sub 50 to Edmund Christian Hay Dixon and Ernestine Gertrude Mary Symons Dixon (site adjacent to Green Gables) February 1934, resub 6 of subs 47 and 48 to Fred and Ethel Havill (Ainslie site) February 1934, resub 5 of subs 47 and 48 to Geraldine Letitia Walsh (Syncarpia site) March 1934, resub 2 of subs 47 and 48 to Mary and Maud Molloy (Ardrossan site) July 1934, resub 9 of subs 49 and 50 to Jack Massie Garnett-Botfield (5 Julius Street site) May 1935, resub 1 of sub 47 (site adjacent to Ardrossan), resub 3 of subs 49 and 50 (Green Gables site), resub 7 of subs 47 and 48 (Pine Lodge site), and resub 8 of subs 49 and 50 (Evelyn Court site) to Ernest William Mazlin.

Seven blocks of flats surrounding Julius Street were constructed between 1934 and 1938. This group of 1930s flat buildings is quite rare in Brisbane. This may be due to changes in Brisbane City Council ordinances regulating flat development which effectively precluded this type of development occurring after 1936–37.

=== Development of the flat or apartment building in Brisbane during the interwar period ===
The purpose designed flat/apartment building emerged as a new form of residential accommodation in Brisbane during the 1920s. Brisbane, in comparison to Sydney and Melbourne, was slow to adopt this form of flat development, but the practice of converting old houses to flats was well established.

By at least the 1910s, Brisbane was following an Australia wide trend of converting larger houses to flats. The incidence of house conversions to flats grew dramatically during the 1920s and 1930s, a period of severe housing shortage in Brisbane. It was not unusual for a single-family dwelling to be converted to a two-family residence, or for a flat to be created underneath a high-set house by filling in between the stumps. Some of these conversions were architect planned, and had Brisbane City Council approval, but many were not, and provided a constant source of concern for the authorities who feared the creation of slum suburbs. The interwar growth of flats of all types in Brisbane posed a major dilemma for local government and for the construction industry.

The severe housing shortage was due mainly to an increasingly buoyant Queensland economy and substantial population growth, as a result of both natural increase and immigration. A rising Brisbane population combined with a substantial fall in the numbers of workers cottages being constructed, created a severe housing shortage. Also, rising rates, maintenance and related costs forced many owners to convert larger houses in flats and to subdivide large parcels of land.

The second form of flat development in the interwar years was the purpose-designed flat or apartment building. Such structures varied considerably in quality and amenity. There were three main types: moderate-rental blocks; more prestigious and luxury flats or apartments; and the bachelor flat. Sometimes these were combined with professional chambers or shops.

The most prominent of the interwar flat building were the substantial, architect-designed blocks aimed at the higher and more long-term rental market. In general, these flats were erected in single blocks usually two or three stories, masonry or a combination of masonry, timber and fibrous cement, and on average comprised six to eight flats. Up to date facilities, including built-ins in the kitchen and bathroom, a refrigerator, hot water system, and telephone, were important selling features. By the 1930s, some were providing facilities such as garbage chutes to a basement incinerator, and garage accommodation. In the most prestigious blocks, a maids bedroom was included with each self-contained apartment. Mostly, the blocks presented handsome street facades, predominantly in the fashionable Old English, Spanish Mission or Mediterranean architectural styles favoured by architects of much of the more prestigious domestic housing in Brisbane during the interwar period. Flats designed in the modernist, Art Deco and Functionalist schools were much rarer.

The single bedroom-cum-sitting room was the precursor to the bachelor flat. The construction of single-sex bachelor flats was a reflection of contemporary Brisbane attitudes which considered flats inappropriate places in which to raise a family, and the mixing of single persons of both sexes in flat buildings was viewed as undesirable and conducive to immoral behaviour. Flats were largely thought of as catering to a floating population and, along with the lifestyle changes necessitated when living beyond the detached house and garden, were yet to be accepted as permanent homes.

In August 1933, a contributor to the Architectural and Building Journal of Queensland envisaged Brisbane developing "a district largely composed of flat dwellings, similar to Darlinghurst in Sydney or St Kilda in Melbourne", which many had thought unlikely. In September 1933, the Courier Mail approached a "prominent Brisbane architect" to comment on the sudden boom in flat construction in Brisbane. A strong trend toward preferences for flat life over suburban housing was identified, the reduction in the size of the average family being considered an important contributing factor. Another rationale may have been economic reasons accounting for the popularity in flat buildings; many working people found that the costs of land, finance, utilities etc. were too expensive and they were turning to rented accommodation in the new well appointed flat and apartment buildings, which in turn created a strong environment for further investment in flat buildings.

Few blocks of flats appear to have been constructed in Brisbane prior to the early to mid-1920s. Suburbs like New Farm were scarcely touched by flat development until the 1930s when substantial numbers of new apartment buildings were constructed. The construction of flat buildings in Brisbane peaked in 1936–37, with a decline in 1938–39 partly due to the uncertain investment climate generated by threats of war in Europe, and partly due to the refusal of banking and financial institutions to lend on flat constructions.

The up-turn in flat construction in the mid-1930s echoed a strong improvement in the Brisbane building industry as a whole, which in 1935 had seen a 67.2% increase in expenditure. The most substantial growth was in the residential sector, with a boom in house building and "phenomenal activity" in flat construction; the number in 1935 exceeding the combined totals of the previous two years. In 1935, 121 flat projects including house conversions were approved by the BCC. Brisbane's housing shortage was acute, and flat buildings were filling a gap in the rental market. Housing shortages continued into 1937, with rents increasing 10% on the previous year. Surprisingly, flat construction declined around this period due to the "stringency of finance" for flat construction.

Ownership laws also contributed to the type of flats which were constructed during the interwar period. In Brisbane, terrace houses were usually intended as rental investments rather than for resale, and the flat buildings of the 1920s and 1930s appear to have been constructed under similar laws relating to tenement buildings. Strata Title was not available in Queensland until 1965, with the introduction of the Building Units Titles Act.

Company Title, in which the land and the building are owned by shareholders who have rights to exclusive use of flats within the building, and areas not allocated for exclusive use (common areas) is understood to have been first employed in Brisbane with the construction of Torbreck Home Units 1958–59. Lease schemes, whereby a developer owns the land and building and leases individual flats to the "owners" may have been in operation much earlier. The leases are long term (e.g. 99 years) and contain covenants to regulate the management of the scheme. Tenancy in common schemes, a form of cooperative ownership in which a group of people own the land and building as tenants in common in agreed shares, may have been employed in Brisbane in the 1930s, when the cooperative housing model based on American systems of cooperative apartment houses first was being promoted in Australia.

It would appear however that the bulk of the flats erected in Brisbane in the interwar period were rental investments.

Investors favoured centrally located positions, close to workplaces, shopping facilities, entertainment and schools, with easy access to public transport. Proximity to a tramline was particularly important, and when the Julius Street flats were constructed, trams ran up Moray Street past Julius Street. This led to a concentration of flat buildings around the principal tramlines running along Brunswick and Moray Streets in New Farm; Hamilton and Sandgate Roads in Hamilton, Ascot, and Clayfield area; Petrie Terrace; Leichhardt Street and St Paul's Terrace in Spring Hill; Grey, Vulture, Melbourne and Stanley Streets in South Brisbane; and Gladstone Road through to Dutton Park. Gregory Terrace, with access to tramlines within easy walking distance, and Wickham Terrace virtually in the Central Business District, were also favoured locations. Kangaroo Point, whilst devoid of a tramline or railway, was close to the CBD, which could be accessed by ferry.

Level sites were popular, and corner blocks were particularly sought after, as they provided each flat with greater access to light and ventilation.

To some extent, flats were viewed as an unavoidable outcome of modern life, and a certain amount of government and industry quality control was enforced. The underlying fear amongst all groups was that indiscriminate and uncontrolled flat development would lead to the creation of city slums.

BCC ordinances, adopted in 1926, included controls over flat developments; both new construction and house conversions. These controls regulated the percentage of the site which could be covered by a flat development; boundary and street alignment setbacks; the provision of separate facilities; soundproofing and privacy. Perhaps the most significant of the ordinances that controlled the flat developments stated that "tenements shall not occupy more than 50% of the allotment of land on which it stands, but when the building is not more than three stories in height it may occupy two-thirds of the allotment". As a result, Brisbane's interwar flats rarely exceeded three storeys.

Zoning was a new concept for Brisbane, and one which was being promoted heavily by the Town Planning Association and the Queensland Institute of Architects during the interwar years. A zoning map had been prepared by previous councils, and in 1935 the BCC appointed a town planning committee. In 1936, the BCC prepared amended regulations to further control the development of flats, which included; no flats permitted on land with a road of less than 50 links in width; no multiple-family building to cover a greater ground area than half the land upon which it is built; multiple-family dwellings to be restricted to two storeys in height, unless constructed of brick, concrete, or other similar fire-resisting material, where height may be increased to three stories (possibly further in exceptional cases). More regulations controlling house conversions, which were seen as developing slum areas, were introduced by the BCC in 1937.

=== Development of each of the seven Julius Street flat buildings ===
==== Ardrossan ====
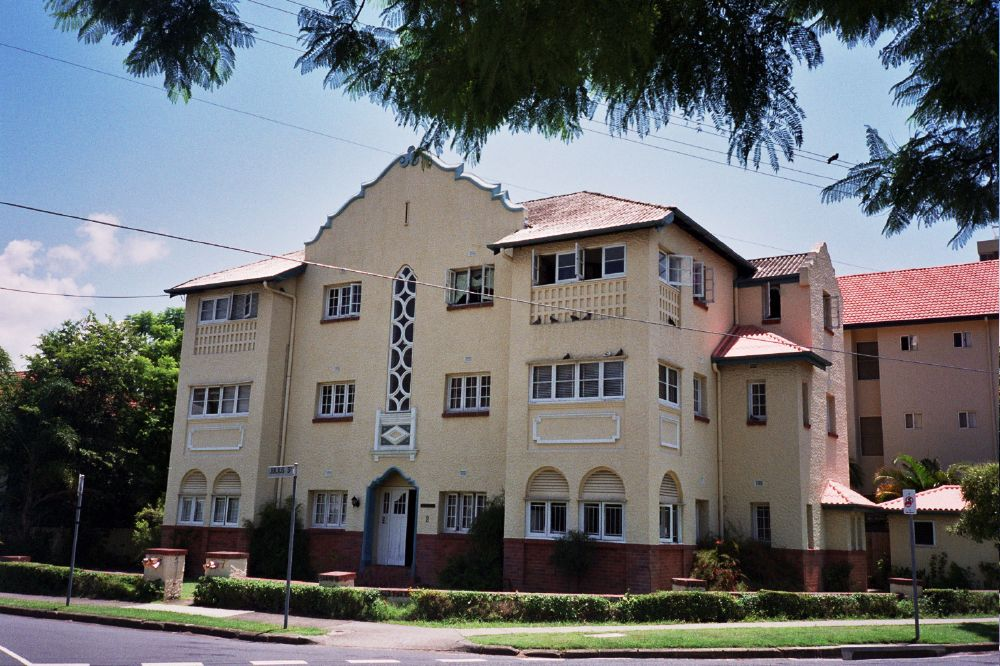
Ardrossan, 2005

In March 1934, resub 2 of subs 47 and 48 was transferred to sisters Mary and Maud Molloy (spinsters) of Bowen Terrace, New Farm. In September 1936, the adjacent allotment, resub 1 of sub 47, was transferred to Mary and Maud Molloy from Ernest William Mazlin.

Ardrossan was designed by prominent Brisbane architects Chambers and Ford in 1934. The contractor was F Lee of Albion, and tender price was £3,500. Chambers and Ford practised in Brisbane from 1920 to 1951, and were responsible for the design of a number of apartment buildings in Brisbane during the interwar period.

The building, a decorative three-storeyed rendered masonry structure with strong Spanish Mission/Mediterranean architectural styling references, is prominently located on the corner of Julius and Moray Streets. The building retains most of its original fabric and contains six flats, each accessed from a central staircase and containing two bedrooms, living room, kitchen, bathroom, an enclosed front sleep-out, and an enclosed rear verandah. When built, the front sleep-outs had roll down slat blinds.

When completed, Miss Mary Molloy resided in apartment no. 4, letting the remainder out. Soon after it was completed, a photograph of Ardrossan was featured in the Queenslander in February 1935 with the caption "The latest in flats- This block of six flats....indicates the latest trend in flat building in Brisbane." During the Second World War, the owners/residents of the Julius Street flats constructed a dug-out air raid shelter in the grounds behind Ardrossan.

Mary Molloy died in February 1957, and the property was transferred to Donald James Shaw in November of that year. The property was transferred to the current owner in October 1967.

==== Green Gables ====
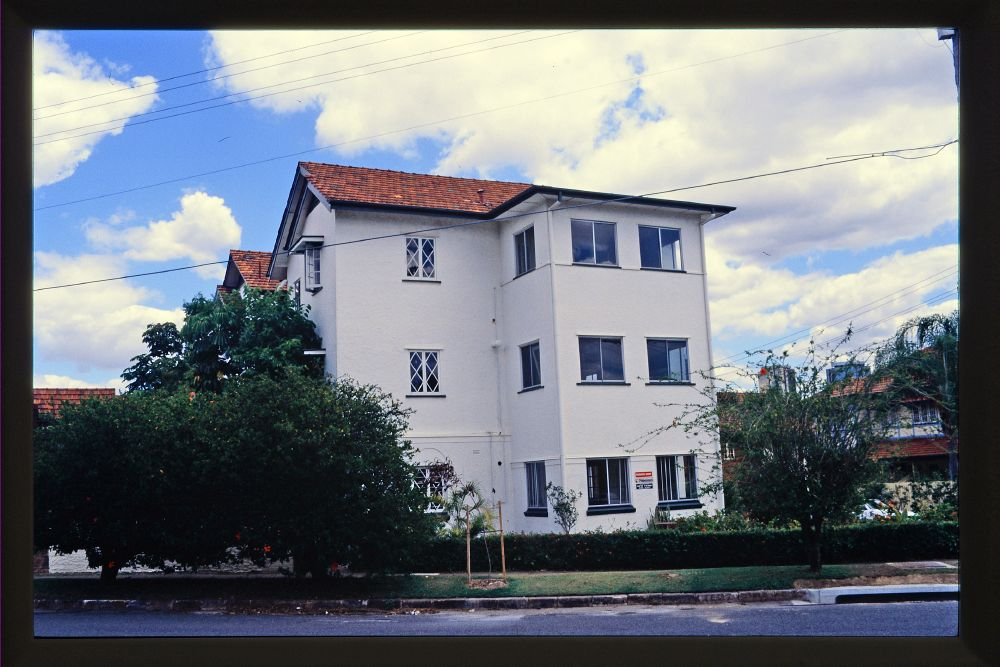
Green Gables, 1996

In May 1935, resub 3 of subs 49 and 50 was transferred to Ernest William Mazlin. This land was then transferred to Charles Robinson, of Kingaroy, in July 1935. At this time, EW Mazlin had acquired the sites for Evelyn Court (resub 8 of subs 49 and 50), Pine Lodge (resub 7 of subs 47 and 48) and the land adjacent to Ardrossan, (resub 1 of sub 47). Refer to Evelyn Court history for details concerning EW Mazlin.

It appears that Green Gables was constructed by Charles Robinson in 1935, but as yet no architect or contractor has been identified. It is possible that Robinson had a connection with EW Mazlin, as at this time EW Mazlin had been residing at his fathers home at 16 Dublin Street, Clayfield, and a Charles Robinson is first listed in the Post Office Directory as residing at 5 Dublin Street, Clayfield in 1934. EW Mazlin then moved to Sandgate Road, Clayfield. The Mazlin family were involved in building construction, and Robinson had purchased the site from Mazlin in July 1935 and Green Gables was being tenanted by August 1935, though it is certain if it was actually completed by this date. This may suggest that the design of the building was in place at purchase, and that Mazlin was involved in the construction. However, this connection has not been confirmed.

The property was sold to Anastasia Weitemeyer in February 1936 for £4750. Anastasia Weitemeyer (née Gorey) and her husband Christian Ernest owned the Gympie Hotel, Bundaberg, and moved to Brisbane c. 1936. Anastasia's parents had owned hotels, and she inherited various properties in areas such as Bundaberg, Maryborough, Gympie and Kalbar. They lived for a few years at "Infracombe", Bonney Avenue, Clayfield, before moving into flat no. 4, Green Gables c. 1940. They had a daughter, Doris, who later inherited the property, and two sons who were killed during the Second World War. Christian Ernest Weitemeyer's parents were Danish settlers who had pioneered the Maleny/Montville region.

Green Gables, a three-storeyed structure with a masonry ground level and timber framed and fibrous cement first and second levels, is prominently located on the corner of Julius Street and Moray Street, opposite Ardrossan. The building has Old English architectural styling references, and at the time of sale, the building was described as containing '6 flats, each flat contains 2 bedrooms, lounge and sleeping-out verandah, smoker's balcony, kitchen and bathroom.... and four garages.' The upper four flats were tenanted at £2/5/- per week, and the ground floor at £2/-/-. When constructed, the building had a rendered masonry ground floor, with the first and second storeys featuring imitation half-timbering, and some ground floor windows had timber shutters. The sleep-outs and smoker's balconies had roll down slat blinds, and a generator to power the refrigerators was located behind the rear stair. The first and second floors were painted pale green, with the ground floor a darker shade of green.

Stucco was applied to the exterior of the building c. 1941. It is thought that this was done to make the building appear as if it were constructed of masonry, and this may have been a reaction to the BCC ordinances, introduced soon after the building's construction, concerning fire-resistant construction. The rear stair was also enclosed with timber lattice at this time.

The open sleep-outs and smoker's balconies were gradually enclosed, from the late 1940s to early 1950s. The southwest flats were completed first, with louvred timber panels initially, and later casement windows, and more recently aluminium framed sliding windows.

Anastasia Weitemeyer lived at Green Gables until her death in September 1969, when the property was transferred to her daughter Doris McDonald who, with her husband John and family, resided at the property until it was sold to the current owners in 1984. Green Gables was Strata Titled in September 1992.

Green Gables has had several long term tenants, an example of whom was Douglas Charles Lohrey Smith, a statistician, and his wife, who first rented a flat from Charles Robinson in August 1935. Douglas Smith lived there until his death in 1979.

==== 5 Julius Street (Julius Lodge, formerly Nanmara) ====
In July 1934, resub 9 of subs 49 and 50 was transferred to Jack Massie Garnett-Botfield, who transferred the property to Sydney Morey in November of that year. In December 1934, the property was transferred to Beatrice Ellen Nichols (spinster) and Robert Sydney Melloy. In the 1938–39 rates details, RS Melloy is recorded as working in the AMP Building, Queen Street.

Julius Lodge, originally named Nanmara, was built for Mr RS Melloy and Miss BE Nichols, and plans were approved by the BCC in November 1934. The building was described at the time of construction as being two-storeyed of brick and fibro construction with a tile roof. The building contained eight flats, four flats per floor, and each flat contained one bedroom, a living room, kitchen, bathroom and verandah. The contractor was Mr S Conwell of Holland Park, and the building was constructed at a cost of £2420. No architect has been identified. Each flat has a front entrance, with rear access from a central corridor, and reports indicate that the exterior of the building originally had imitation half-timbering.

The building has had a second bedroom added to each flat, to each of the four corners of the structure. These additions are constructed of masonry, and the verandahs have been enclosed. Stucco has been applied to the exterior of the building.

In May 1959, the property was transferred to Oswald and Emily Grant. In March 1960, the property was transferred to John Dennis Collins, who may have changed its name from Nanmara to Julius Lodge. Collins retained it until his death in July 1976, when it was transferred to Patrick James Collins and Maxine Hefferman. Julius Lodge was transferred to the current owners in September 1986.

==== Syncarpia ====
In February 1934, resub 5 of subs 47 and 48 was transferred to Mrs Geraldine Letitia Walsh, for whom Syncarpia was built. The building was designed as an "apartment house" by Brisbane architects Addison and Macdonald in 1934. The contractor was JR Holmes of Mt Tamborine, and the tender price was £1665. Addison and Macdonald practised in Brisbane from 1928 to 1940.

The building is a two storeyed timber-framed structure with imitation half-timbering and stucco infill panels. The name of the building, Syncarpia, is the generic name for Turpentine which is a type of timber used in ship building and in marine environments. The name may have been chosen in connection to the site's former use as a sawmill.

When completed, Mrs GL Walsh resided in apartment no. 1, letting the remainder out. The building appears to have contained seven flats when constructed, with a shared bathroom. A single-storeyed rear wing was added sometime after 1937. Initially, the building was rented only to males, but later reports suggest that Syncarpia became a boarding house for single females.

Syncarpia remained in the ownership of the Walsh family, transferring to Peter Joseph Walsh and Patrick Leonard Vincent Walsh in December 1963, until March 1980 when it was transferred to William Valmond. The property was transferred to Michael Bunder in June 1984, and later the building was converted into five flats which were Strata Titled in June 1994 and transferred to the current owners.

==== Ainslie ====
In February 1934, resub 6 of subs 47 and 48 was transferred to Fred and Ethel Havill.

Ainslie was built in 1934–35 by Fred and Ethel Havill, owners and contractors, who resided at Merthyr Road, New Farm. It appears that the property may have been a speculative venture, as it was transferred John Stapleton in August 1935. The Havill family were involved in a number of flat/apartment building developments during that period of the 1930s in Brisbane, and in particular New Farm. H Havill had also been involved in the construction of Pine Lodge, and had also submitted a tender for Ardrossan.

Ainslie is a two storeyed masonry structure and contains four two bedroom flats, with a kitchen, bathroom, front sleep-out (enclosed), and rear verandah (enclosed). Each apartment has front and rear access, with an entry porch on the southwest side and, similar to a number of the other Julius Street flat/apartment buildings, Ainslie has Old English architectural styling references.

John Stapleton died in April 1941, and the property was transferred to trustees until December 1953 when it was transferred to Herbert Antcliff. In December 1958, the site was amalgamated with the rear allotment, and a masonry residence was later constructed across the allotment boundary. Antcliff died in July 1964, since which time the property has had several owners. The property was transferred to the current owners in December 1984.

==== Pine Lodge (formerly Aloha Court) ====
In May 1935, resub 7 of subs 47 and 48 was transferred to Ernest William Mazlin. At this time, EW Mazlin also acquired the site for Evelyn Court (resub 8 of subs 49 and 50), as well as the site for Green Gables (resub 3 of subs 49 and 50) and the land adjacent to Ardrossan (resub 1 of sub 47), both of which were sold soon after.

Pine Lodge, originally named Aloha Court, was constructed by owner contractor Ernest William Mazlin of Sandgate Road, Clayfield.

EW Mazlin's father William Mazlin was one of four brothers who pioneered the Atherton Tableland in 1880. Thomas, James and John were interested in procuring cedar and in 1881 their youngest brother William located a vast stand at a place he named Cedar Creek, now Ravenshoe. The Mazlin brothers were also heavily involved in mining. William Mazlin married Isabella Pasley and in March 1883 became the first selector on the Evelyn Tableland, not far from Herberton. His house, Orange Grove, still stands, and Ernest William was the eldest of eleven children born at Evelyn. Ernest was born on 9 September 1884, and known as Will, was educated at Evelyn and Herberton State Schools and later gained a Diploma in Engineering as an external student of the University of Queensland. He became a builder, cabinet maker and contractor, but was best known as the proprietor of a large sawmill in Ravenshoe. He also played a prominent role in the civic affairs of Ravenshoe and the surrounding district. Ernest married Ann White in 1912, and they had no children.

Ernest's father William moved his family to Brisbane c. 1918. He built a house at 16 Dublin Street, Clayfield (extant) which he named "Evelyn" in memory of his years pioneering on the Atherton and Evelyn Tablelands. Ernest Mazlin and his wife moved to Brisbane c. 1934 and initially resided at his fathers house at 16 Dublin Street, Clayfield. They moved to 842–854 New Sandgate Road, Clayfield in 1935, with a George Oxnam at a property later named Ivondale Flats. Ernest and his brother Herbert appear to have purchased land and built speculative houses in Brisbane, and Ernest was involved in sawmills with his brother Percy. Ernest died on 5 June 1968 in Brisbane.

EW Mazlin and Julius Rosenfeld had an agreement concerning Mazlin's Ravenshoe mill and the land at Julius Street, New Farm. The details of the agreement are not known, but included the transfer of the Julius Street allotments to EW Mazlin in May 1935, and the Ravenshoe mill to Rosenfeld in 1934 which, by this time was operating as the Rosenfeld & Sons saw and planning mills. The agreement appears to have included options over other land, which Rosenfeld could exercise, for logging purposes and the use of the subsequent cleared land. Eric Rosenfeld, who operated Rosenfeld's Ravenshoe mill, was also a Cairns merchant who was involved in exporting timber from other sawmills, such as Pearson Brothers sawmill, Evelyn Tablelands, to London.

Initially, four of the nine allotments were transferred to EW Mazlin; two river front, one corner and one fronting Moray Street. It appears that RV Brady, builder of Ashgrove, who was also involved in the construction of Evelyn Court, was involved in the construction of Pine Lodge, however invoices indicate that Mazlin paid for materials, subcontractor's wages and sundries. The building was constructed in 1935, and records indicate that the total cost of the building was £4402, but in comparison to the relative costs of the other apartment buildings in Julius Street, this figure seems excessive. Pine Lodge shares the same floor plan as Evelyn Court adjacent, and it appears that both buildings were planned by June 1935 when both allotments were subdivided to allow for driveway access. No architect has been identified, however RV Brady was the author of the plans for the adjacent Evelyn Court, which shares the same floor plan, and the Mazlin family were involved in several building projects in Brisbane. Pine Lodge (Aloha Court) was first registered with the BCC as a "flat building" in March 1936.

Pine Lodge is a two-storeyed reinforced concrete structure containing four two bedroom flats with a kitchen, bathroom, living room, dining room and enclosed sleep-out. Each unit is accessed via a central hall and stair, and also a rear entry. The building has projecting window bays, with a similar floor plan and detailing to the adjoining Evelyn Court. The building has Old English architectural styling references, quite different to the adjacent Art Deco styling of Evelyn Court. The building is built near the edge of a steep embankment/cutting above the remains of two lime kilns (Langshaw Marble Lime Works), and overlooking the Brisbane River.

In 1941, the property was transferred to Ralph David Sigmund Schureck who worked for Austral Lighting Co in Elizabeth Street, Brisbane. Since that time, the property has had a number of changes of ownership, and was transferred to the current owners in July 1989.

==== Evelyn Court ====
In May 1935, resub 8 of subs 49 and 50 was transferred to Ernest William Mazlin. At this time, EW Mazlin also acquired the site for Pine Lodge (resub 7 of subs 47 and 48), as well as the site for Green Gables (resub 3 of subs 49 and 50) and the land adjacent to Ardrossan (resub 1 of sub 47), both of which were sold soon after.

Evelyn Court was constructed by owner contractor Ernest William Mazlin of Sandgate Road, Clayfield. (Refer to the Pine Lodge History for details)

The site plan for Evelyn Court appears to have been determined, along with Pine Lodge, by June 1935 when both allotments were subdivided to allow for driveway access. The building is shown on a BCC sewerage detail plan dated 1937, however construction was not completed until 1938. The plans for the building are signed by RV Brady, builder of Ashgrove, who may also have been the contractor, or worked for EW Mazlin in a supervisory capacity, as in some instances invoices were addressed to both Mazlin and Brady.

The building was originally designed with a hipped roof, similar to Pine Lodge, but at some stage of construction the design was altered to accommodate a flat roof. The specification for the building specifies a hipped roof. A flat roof, as detailed in Australian Gypsum Products Pty Ltd technical brochures, was constructed. The roof had waterproofing problems, and was resealed several times throughout the 1940s. Since that time, bituminous material has been applied to the roof several times. The exterior treatment of the building was also altered with Art Deco styling emphasising vertical elements and a stepped parapet.

The building was tenanted in December 1938 at £2/15/- per week, however work was being completed in early 1939. BCC files indicate that the building was first registered as a "flat building" in 1939.

Evelyn Court is a three storeyed masonry structure containing six two bedroom flats with a kitchen, bathroom, living room, dining room and enclosed sleep-out. Each unit is accessed via a central hall and stair, and a rear entry. The building has projecting window bays, with a similar floor plan and detailing to the adjoining Pine Lodge. The building has Art Deco architectural styling references, quite different to the adjacent Old English styling of Pine Lodge. The building also has a one bedroom flat underneath, which appears to have been enclosed at a later date. The building has garbage chutes to an incinerator (no longer in use), and a flat roof with stair access from the top foyer.

Evelyn Court shares the same name as Ernest's father's house "Evelyn", 16 Dublin Street, Clayfield, and "Evelyn" the family property near the Evelyn Tablelands in Far North Queensland.

In January 1951, Evelyn Court was transferred to Doris Margaret Back, Joan Cosby Back, Victor Merfyn Houseman, and Gloria Elaine Houseman. Since that time, the property has had a number of different owners, and was transferred to the current owners in March 1996.

=== Julius Street ===
Julius Street was dedicated by the Brisbane City Council in February 1934, and was named after Julius Rosenfeld. Reports indicate that the Julius Street flat buildings originally had well maintained gardens, which existed well into the 1960s, and remnants of which survive.

Julius Street, a short and narrow cul-de-sac, is surrounded by a highly intact group of 1930s flat buildings, and as such is recognised by the local community as having a distinct sense of place. This sense of place is reflected in the diverse social history associated with the place. This perception has also been reinforced by the identification of all of the Julius Street properties in the New Farm and Teneriffe Hill Development Control Plan as places of cultural heritage significance, and the recent actions of resident groups.

== Description ==
=== Ardrossan ===
Ardrossan, a decorative three-storeyed rendered masonry structure with strong Spanish Mission/Mediterranean architectural styling references, is prominently located on the northern corner of Julius and Moray Streets, opposite Green Gables. The building has a hipped, corrugated fibrous cement roof, and face brickwork to ground floor sill height with stucco above. Most windows are multi-paned casements with face brick sills.

The building has a symmetrical elevation facing Julius Street to the southeast, which consists of a central section surmounted by a decorative shaped gable parapet, with projecting enclosed sleep-outs to either side. The sleep-outs have casement windows above balustrade height, and different overall detailing to each floor; the ground floor has recessed arches to the front and side; the first floor has a rectangular moulding to the balustrade section; and the second floor has an infilled lattice pattern to the balustrade section.

A recessed, covered entry is located centrally, and consists of paired timber panelled doors and sidelights with glass panels to the upper section. The glass panels to the doors have ogee shaped framing to the outer, upper corners. The entrance has a shaped arch, stylistically similar to the shaped gable to the parapet above, and is accessed via a flight of three brick steps. The entrance is surmounted by a rectangular shaped relief moulding, with a central diamond pattern and a cornice base. Above this, a central stair-light extends from the first to second floor, and contains a series of tangential arc mouldings along its length, with moulded glass panels. A narrow slit, possibly for ventilation, is located centrally in the gable parapet above. A three panel casement window is located on each floor either side of the central entrance feature.

The northeast elevation to Moray Street has an offset narrow projecting gable, surmounted by a shaped parapet, with a hipped section to the first floor, and a lower hipped section to the ground floor. The ground floor hipped section has paired arched casement windows, and the second floor hipped section has a narrow casement window to both floors.

The southwest and northwest elevations have corrugated fibrous cement sunhoods to bedroom windows. The rear verandahs are enclosed with casement windows above fibrous cement sheeted balustrades. A metal stair is located centrally at the rear accessing back landings.

The building contains two flats per floor, each accessed from a central internal staircase at the front, and an external staircase and back landing at the rear. Each flat contains two bedrooms, a living room, kitchen, bathroom, an enclosed front sleep-out, and an enclosed rear verandah.

The entrance staircase is constructed of varnished timber with slim balusters and square newel posts. The timber entrance doors and sidelights are also varnished, as are panelled timber front doors to each flat. Stairs and landing are also of timber. The stair-light extends from the first to the second floor. Walls are rendered masonry, and ceilings have plaster mouldings.

Each flat has decorative plaster ceilings to most rooms, and multi-paned French doors open from the main bedroom to the enclosed sleep-out. Doors, architraves and skirtings are finished in varnished timber, with plate rails to the living room. Internal walls are plastered, with paint or paper finish, and the kitchen has been refitted.

A detached single garage is located on the northern side of the building fronting Moray Street. This structure is constructed of rendered masonry, with a hipped corrugated fibrous cement roof and paired timber garage doors. Timber framed and fibrous cement sheeted garages are located adjacent to the building on the southwest. A low rendered masonry wall, with squat pillars and face brick cappings, is located along the Moray and Julius Street frontages, with metal gates to the southern driveway.

=== Green Gables ===
Green Gables, a three-storeyed structure with a masonry ground level and timber framed and fibrous cement first and second levels, is prominently located on the southern corner of Julius Street and Moray Street, opposite Ardrossan. The building has a tiled multi-gable roof and Old English architectural styling references, and soon after construction, the building was described as containing '6 flats, each flat contains 2 bedrooms, lounge and sleeping-out verandah, smoker's balcony, kitchen and bathroom.... and four garages.' When constructed, the building had a rendered masonry ground floor on a face-brick base, the first and second storeys featured imitation half-timbering, and the sleep-outs and smoker's balconies had roll down slat blinds. Stucco has been applied to the exterior of the building covering the imitation half-timbering.

The building has a symmetrical elevation facing Julius Street to the northwest. This comprises a central recessed section containing the entrance stair and landings, with projecting wings, stepped in plan, to both sides. Either side of the entrance section, diamond paned corner windows step out to a small room with a chamfered outside corner, formerly the 'smoker's balcony', which has been enclosed with aluminium framed sliding windows. Each wing culminates in a projecting gable section, jettied at the first floor, with central diamond paned casement windows and cantilevered sunhoods, with timber shutters to the ground level. Both ends of the building have sleep-outs enclosed with aluminium sliding windows. The ground floor entrance has a screen wall with paired arched openings and a stepped, tiled parapet, with the name "GREEN GABLES" in relief. The glass entrance door, with narrow timber mullions, is offset to the right, and two small diamond paned casement windows step up following the line of the stair, with a tall narrow diamond paned stair-light between the first and second floors.

Each end of the building has a single diamond paned casement window on the southern side, with the enclosed sleep-outs to the northern side. The ground level window has a recessed arched header. The rear of the building has a recessed central timber staircase, with projecting timber lattice screening, flanked by gable sections with aluminium framed sliding windows. A small projecting gable section, jettied at the first floor, with central casement windows and sunhoods, is located at either end.

The building contains two flats per floor, each accessed from a central internal staircase at the front, and a screened external staircase and back landing at the rear. Each flat contains two bedrooms, a living room, kitchen, bathroom, separate toilet, an enclosed sleep-out, and an enclosed 'smoker's balcony'.

The entrance has a timber open well staircase with winders, and square balusters and newel posts. Ground floor internal walls are rendered masonry, and first and second floor walls are timber framed with recessed fibrous cement panels.

Each flat has decorative plaster ceilings to most rooms, multi-paned French doors open from the main bedroom to the enclosed sleep-out, and multi-paned single doors open to the enclosed 'smoker's balcony'. Internal doors, architraves and skirtings are finished in painted timber, and the rear kitchen doors have glass panes to the upper section. Kitchens and bathrooms have been refitted, and timber 'tradesman's cupboards' are located outside the rear door to each flat.

Four timber framed and fibrous cement sheeted garages are located adjacent to the building on the southwest. A low brick wall, with squat pillars and a low hedge, is located along the Moray and Julius Street frontages, with a timber gate to the Moray Street entrance on the southern side. The Julius Street frontage has rows of ornamental planting.

=== 5 Julius Street ===
Lot 9 on RP 50498. The existing structures on this site are not included in the heritage listing for the Julius Street Flats.

=== Syncarpia ===
Syncarpia, a two-storeyed structure finished in imitation half-timbering, has a tiled hipped roof and concrete stumps. The building, located between Green Gables and Ainslie, has Old English architectural styling references, and fronts Julius Street to the southeast.

The building has a symmetrical elevation to Julius Street, with a recessed central section comprising a ground floor verandah, and multi-paned casement windows with tiled hipped window hoods to the first floor. The verandah has a tiled skillion roof, timber floor, central square timber posts, and corner columns composed of chamfered posts with stucco infill panels. The multi-paned glass entrance door is located centrally, and is accessed via timber steps to the verandah. The name SYNCARPIA is painted on the fascia above the entrance steps. Timber screens divide off either end of the verandah for the private use of the adjoining flats. These have multi-paned French doors opening onto the verandah. The southeast and northeast elevations have rough-cast stucco finish to the imitation half-timbering, whereas the other elevations have a flat painted finish.

The central section is flanked by projecting end sections with central multi-paned casement windows, with tiled hipped window hoods, surmounting feature panels of diagonal half-timbering. The side elevations have multi-paned casement windows, with sunhoods on the southwest side. A single-storeyed wing, which has been added to the rear of the building to the northwest, has a tiled gable roof, concrete stumps, multi-paned casement windows, and glass louvred panels which enclose what appears to have been an open side verandah. The northwest rear elevation has multi-paned casement windows with window hoods, and a metal framed stair to a first floor landing.

When constructed, the building appears to have contained seven flats with a shared bathroom. It currently contains five self-contained flats; two ground floor and three first floor flats containing one, two and three bedrooms. Access is via a central ground floor hallway to an internal quarter turn stair with winders. The stair has a timber balustrade to the first floor, and internal walls are mostly timber framed with fibrous cement sheeting. Some rooms have decorative plaster ceilings, and kitchens and bathrooms have been refitted.

A garden area, with some established trees, is located to the north of the building, and a carport and shed are located to the northwest adjoining the rear boundary. The Julius Street frontage has a timber paling fence on a brick base enclosing two front garden areas, containing large Palm trees, separated by a central entrance pathway.

=== Ainslie ===
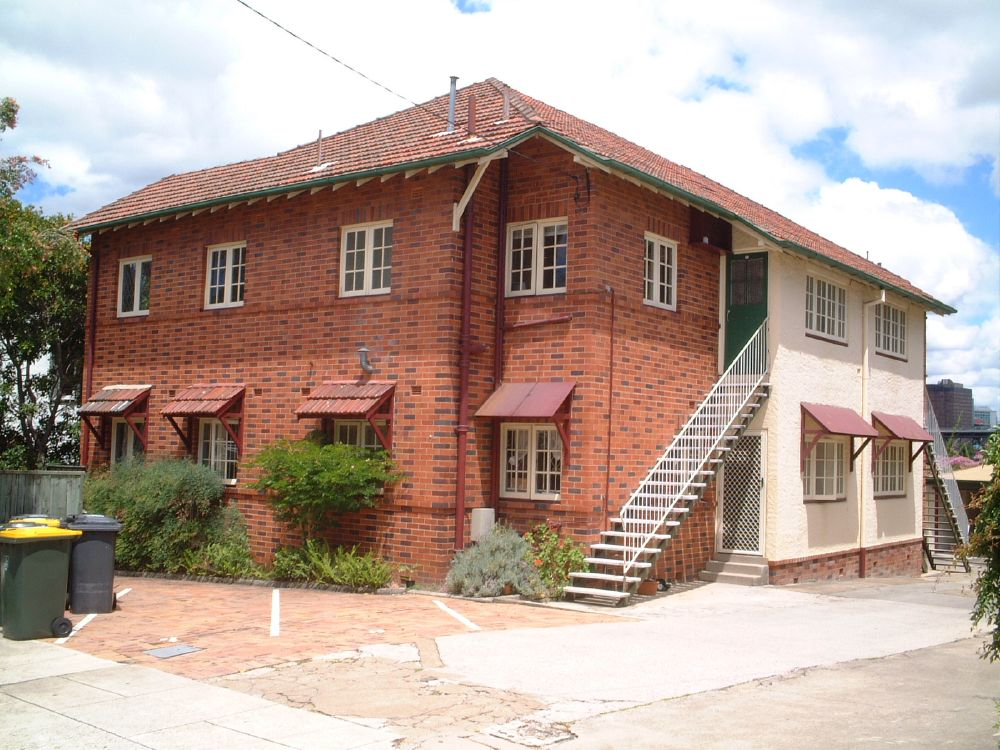
Ainslie, 2004

Ainslie is a two-storeyed masonry structure with a tiled hipped roof with projecting gables to the southwest. The building has Old English architectural styling references, and is located between Syncarpia and Pine Lodge fronting Julius Street to the southeast. The building has stretcher bond face brickwork, with regularly spaced darker bricks giving a patterned finish, and expressed coursing at sill height.

The building has a symmetrical entrance elevation facing southwest, which consists of a central section with a ground floor verandah, with projecting enclosed sleep-outs to either side. The sleep-outs have leaded, diamond paned casement windows, and are surmounted by a gable with stucco infill. The verandah has a tiled skillion roof supported by short, paired timber posts on brick piers, and a timber balustrade with crossed central balusters, and a curved timber valance. The verandah also has a concrete floor on a brick base, with a quarter turn stair at either end with a low brick balustrade with a curved parapet. Four central entrance doors, accessing each of the flats, open off the verandah, and are flanked by leaded, diamond paned casement windows with face brick to sill height and stucco above. The first floor has stucco finish, and centrally positioned paired, arched, diamond paned windows above a basketweave patterned feature brickwork panel.

Either end of the building has multi-paned casement windows, with tiled window hoods to the ground level. The northwest end has a basement laundry, and an awning linking an adjacent single-storeyed brick residence to the northwest. The northeast rear elevation has centrally positioned enclosed verandahs to both levels, with stucco finish, casement windows, and window hoods to the ground level. The enclosed verandahs are accessed from either end by metal framed stairs.

The building contains four two bedroom flats, each with a living room, kitchen, bathroom, enclosed front sleep-out, and enclosed rear verandah. Each flat has decorative plaster ceilings to most rooms, and French doors open from the bedrooms to the enclosed sleep-out and enclosed verandah. Doors (some with upper glass panels), architraves and skirtings are finished in painted timber, with plate rails to the living room. Internal walls are plastered, with paint finish, and the kitchens and bathrooms have non-original fixtures. The southwest paired, arched, diamond paned windows light the living rooms in the two first floor flats.

Skillion roofed carports are located to the north of the building at the rear of the site.

=== Pine Lodge ===
Pine Lodge, a two-storeyed rendered reinforced concrete structure with a tiled multi-gable roof, is located between Ainslie and Evelyn Court, fronting Julius Street to the east and overlooking the Brisbane River to the west. The building has Old English architectural styling references, quite different from the adjacent Art Deco styling of Evelyn Court which shares a very similar floor plan and similar details. The riverfront part of the site contains the remains of lime kilns (Langshaw Marble Lime Works), which are located below a steep embankment to the west of Pine Lodge.

The symmetrical Julius Street elevation comprises two gable end sections flanking a lower central entry. The end sections have paired casement windows with concrete window hoods to both floors, and the gables have boarded ends. The entry court is recessed, with a central multi-paned French door with concrete nib and hood surround, flanked by leaded, diamond paned sash windows. The first floor projects above the entry (possibly an enclosed verandah), and has a long leaded, diamond paned casement window, and the name PINE LODGE in relief.

The end elevations are gabled and stepped in plan, culminating in a gable section with a central bay window to each floor. Each bay has leaded diamond paned casement windows, with concrete brackets, nib and hood surrounds. Both elevations have a concrete quarter-turn stair with landing at the eastern end, with a porch at the landing level, leading to the rear doors of the upper flats. The porch has chamfered upper corners and a square concrete corner post, and the stair has a solid concrete balustrade. The northern end has a basement laundry, and the southern end has two basement garages, with a small terrace area above.

The symmetrical western elevation consists of a recessed, central entrance, with bay windows to either side, flanked by projecting enclosed sleep-outs. The bay windows have leaded diamond paned casement windows (some of which have been replaced with aluminium framed sliding units), concrete brackets, nib and hood surrounds, and are surmounted by gables to the roof. The sleep-outs have leaded diamond paned casement windows above balustrade height (some of which have also been replaced with sliding aluminium framed units), with chamfered upper corners and non-original window hoods. The design and detailing of the sleep-outs indicate that they may have been enclosed after construction. The central entrance has multi-paned French doors accessed via concrete steps. A concrete path, which is located along the front of the western elevation, is bordered by a fence with concrete piers and a metal railing above a steep embankment.

Pine Lodge contains four two bedroom flats, each with a kitchen, bathroom, living room, dining room and enclosed sleep-out. Each flat is accessed via a central hall and stair, and also a rear entry. The central stair is constructed of concrete with terrazzo treads and a concrete balustrade. Each flat has decorative plaster ceilings to most rooms, and multi-paned French doors open from the main bedroom to the enclosed sleep-out. Doors, architraves and skirtings are finished in painted timber, with plate rails to the living and dining rooms. Leaded diamond paned swing doors separate the living and dining rooms. Internal walls are plastered with paint or paper finish, and the kitchens have been refitted.

A single-storeyed concrete double garage, with a tiled gable roof, is located to the southeast of the building, with its rear wall built on top of the remains of the lime kilns below. The driveway, which is shared with the adjoining Evelyn Court, is located to the south of the building. The Julius Street frontage has a concrete fence with a central metal gate. A garden area is located to the north of the building, with access to stairs which lead down to the riverbank below. A disused single-storeyed rendered masonry boat shed, with a corrugated fibrous cement gable roof, is located on the riverbank to the west of Pine Lodge. The boat shed has scribed render to imitate ashlar, casement windows and a rear timber door. The site contains established trees and plantings.

=== Evelyn Court ===
Evelyn Court, a three-storeyed rendered masonry structure with a trafficable flat roof, is located between Pine Lodge and Julius Lodge, fronting Julius Street to the northeast and overlooking the Brisbane River to the west. The building has Art Deco architectural styling references, quite different from the adjacent Old English styling of Pine Lodge which shares a very similar floor plan and similar details.

The building was originally designed with a hipped roof, similar to Pine Lodge, but at some stage of construction the design was altered to accommodate a flat roof. The exterior treatment of the building was also altered, with Art Deco styling emphasising vertical elements and a stepped parapet.

The symmetrical western elevation consists of a recessed central entrance, with bay windows to either side, flanked by projecting enclosed sleep-outs. The recessed central entrance, accessed via a quarter-turn concrete stair with landing, has a concrete canopy supported by stylised columns, and a metal balustrade. Each level above has a casement window, and the roof has a large curved parapet, higher than the adjacent parapet. The bays have mostly leaded diamond paned casement windows, concrete brackets, nib and hood surrounds. The sleep-outs have mostly leaded diamond paned casement windows above balustrade height, continuous concrete window hoods which wrap around onto the side elevation, and a diamond pattern in relief to the corner wall sections.

The end elevations are stepped in plan, culminating in a projecting section with a bay window to each floor. Each bay has mostly leaded diamond paned casement windows, with concrete brackets, nib and hood surrounds. The northern end of the building has the name EVELYN COURT in relief on the parapet above the bay section. Both elevations have concrete quarter-turn stairs with landings at the eastern end, with a porch at the landing level, leading to the rear doors of the first and second floor flats (the stairs to the second floor flats have more flights). The porches have chamfered upper corners and square concrete corner posts, and the stairs have metal rail balustrade with a circular pattern. A disused garbage chute is adjacent to each porch. The below floor area of the southern end of the building has been enclosed to form a small, one bedroom flat.

The symmetrical northeast rear elevation comprises two end sections flanking a recessed central entry. The end sections have paired, mostly leaded diamond paned casement windows with concrete window hoods to each floor. The entry is recessed, with a central door flanked by diamond paned casement windows. A doorway from the landing between the first and second floors opens to an external cantilevered concrete stair with a metal balustrade which accesses the roof.

Evelyn Court contains six two bedroom flats, each with a kitchen, bathroom, living room, dining room and enclosed sleep-out. Each flat is accessed via a central hall and stair, and also a rear entry. The central stair is constructed of concrete with a metal balustrade, and the hall has a terrazzo floor. Each flat has decorative plaster ceilings to most rooms, and French doors with leaded glass panels open from the main bedroom to the enclosed sleep-out. Joinery is stained or painted, and leaded diamond paned swing doors separate the living and dining rooms in most flats. Internal walls are plastered, kitchens have been refitted, and bathrooms retain original black and white tiling. The roof has been covered in layers or bitumen in an attempt to correct waterproofing problems.

A row of garages, located along the southern boundary of the site, is accessed via a concrete driveway along the western side of Evelyn Court. The riverbank contains some established trees and plantings.

=== Julius Street ===
Julius Street, a short and narrow cul-de-sac, is surrounded by a highly intact group of 1930s flat buildings, and as such is recognised by the local community as a distinct place.

== Heritage listing ==
Julius Street Flats New Farm was listed on the Queensland Heritage Register on 4 August 1997 having satisfied the following criteria.

The place is important in demonstrating the evolution or pattern of Queensland's history.

The Julius Street Flats, consisting of seven properties comprising Ardrossan, Green Gables, 5 Julius Street, Syncarpia, Ainslie, Pine Lodge, and Evelyn Court, are located fronting Julius Street, a short cul-de-sac off Moray Street, New Farm. The seven properties were constructed between 1934 and 1938 on a parcel of land subdivided in 1933 by Julius Rosenfeld, who had operated Rosenfeld's Sawmill on the site from c. 1924. The place is important in demonstrating the pattern of residential development in Brisbane, and in particular New Farm, during the interwar period when substantial numbers of flat/apartment buildings were constructed. The increase in the number of flat/apartment buildings being constructed during this period, particularly the mid-1930s, demonstrates the increase in Brisbane's population and the subsequent high demand for accommodation due to a shortage of housing. It also reflects changing community attitudes to desirable and acceptable forms of housing. The place, together with the associated remnant lime kilns (Langshaw Marble Lime Works), is also important in demonstrating the former semi-industrial usage of the New Farm riverfront.

The place demonstrates rare, uncommon or endangered aspects of Queensland's cultural heritage.

The place is important as a rare example of a group of highly intact 1930s flat/apartment buildings. This rarity is partly the result of Brisbane City Council ordinances changing in 1936–37, which effectively precluded this type of development occurring after that time. The subdivision and subsequent development of the former Rosenfeld Sawmill site occurred over a short period of time, with all of the flat/apartment buildings having been designed, and most built, from c. 1934–35.

The place is important in demonstrating the principal characteristics of a particular class of cultural places.

The place demonstrates the three main types of purpose designed flat buildings being designed and constructed in Brisbane during the interwar period. These include the bachelor flat, the moderate rental blocks, and the more prestigious architect designed blocks. The Julius Street Flats also demonstrate the fashionable styles, including Old English, Spanish Mission or Mediterranean, favoured by architects of much of the more prestigious domestic housing in Brisbane during the interwar period. Flats designed in the modernist, Art Deco and Functionalist schools were much rarer. The place is also important as it includes Ardrossan, an important example of a flat/apartment building designed by prominent Brisbane architects Chambers and Ford.

The place is important because of its aesthetic significance.

Julius Street, a short and narrow cul-de-sac, is surrounded by a highly intact group of 1930s flat buildings, and as such is recognised as having a distinct sense of place. The Julius Street Flats have considerable aesthetic significance as a highly intact group of 1930s flat buildings, designed in a range of fashionable styles favoured by architects of much of the more prestigious domestic housing in Brisbane during the interwar period. The place is important as it contains some examples of particular architectural merit, and through its massing, scale, form, materials and detailing, makes an important contribution to the Moray Street streetscape, and to the urban fabric of New Farm. The place also makes an important aesthetic contribution to the Brisbane River.

The place has a strong or special association with a particular community or cultural group for social, cultural or spiritual reasons.

The place has strong associations with the local community, which is reflected in its diverse social history, and its importance is demonstrated through recent resident action to ensure its conservation.

The place has a special association with the life or work of a particular person, group or organisation of importance in Queensland's history.

The place is important because, through its former use as a site for a sawmill, its subdivision and subsequent development, it has a special association with Julius Rosenfeld and Ernest Mazlin, and their contribution to the timber milling industry in Queensland.
