= James Alexander Campbell =

James Alexander Campbell may refer to:

- James Alexander Campbell (politician) (1825–1908), Scottish MP and privy councillor
- James A. Campbell (Medal of Honor) (1844–1904), American Civil War soldier
- James Campbell (rugby union) (1858–1902), Scottish rugby player

== See also ==
- James Campbell (disambiguation)
