= Langshaw Marble Lime Works =

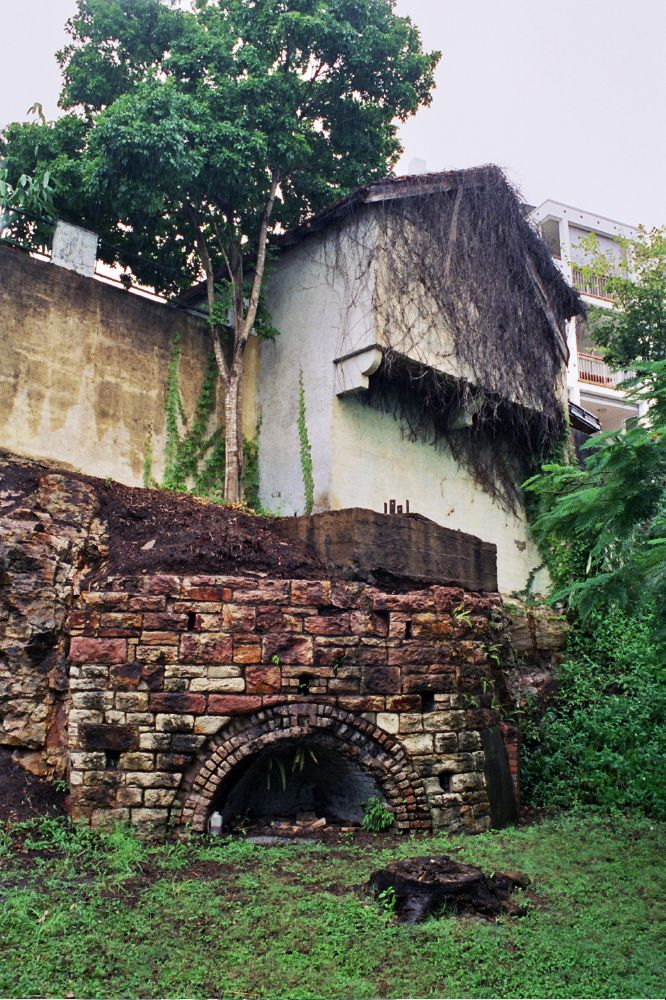
- Remains of the Langshaw Marble Lime Works, 2003

- Location within Queensland Location within Australia
- 27.4684°S 153.0405°E
- Location: 12 Julius Street, New Farm, City of Brisbane, Queensland, Australia

History
- Design period: 1870s–1890s (late 19th century)
- Built: c. 1878–c. 1881

Queensland Heritage Register
- Official name: Remains of the Langshaw Marble Lime Works, Langshaw Marble Lime Works
- Type: state heritage (built, archaeological)
- Designated: 13 October 1997
- Reference no.: 601885
- Significant period: 1878–c. 1881 (fabric) c. 1881–1894 (historical)
- Significant components: kiln

Langshaw Marble Lime Works is a heritage-listed remains of a former lime kiln at 12 Julius Street, New Farm, City of Brisbane, Queensland, Australia. It was built from c. 1878 to c. 1881. It was added to the Queensland Heritage Register on 13 October 1997.

== History ==
The lime kilns on the banks of the Brisbane River at New Farm, below Julius Street, appear to have been established in the late 1870s by Brisbane merchant James Campbell, who traded as James Campbell and Sons from 1882 and James Campbell and Sons Ltd from 1896, and who had established the Langshaw Marble Lime Works on the New Farm site by 1881.

The firm of James Campbell and Sons was one of Brisbane's earliest and longest established suppliers of building materials, which in the second half of the 19th century specialised in the retailing of lime, cement, plaster, paints and timber, and operated saw and planing mills, plantations, lime works and pottery kilns in a number of locations in southeast Queensland, as well as Campbell's wharf and warehouse at Creek Street, Brisbane, and a substantial fleet of freight vessels.

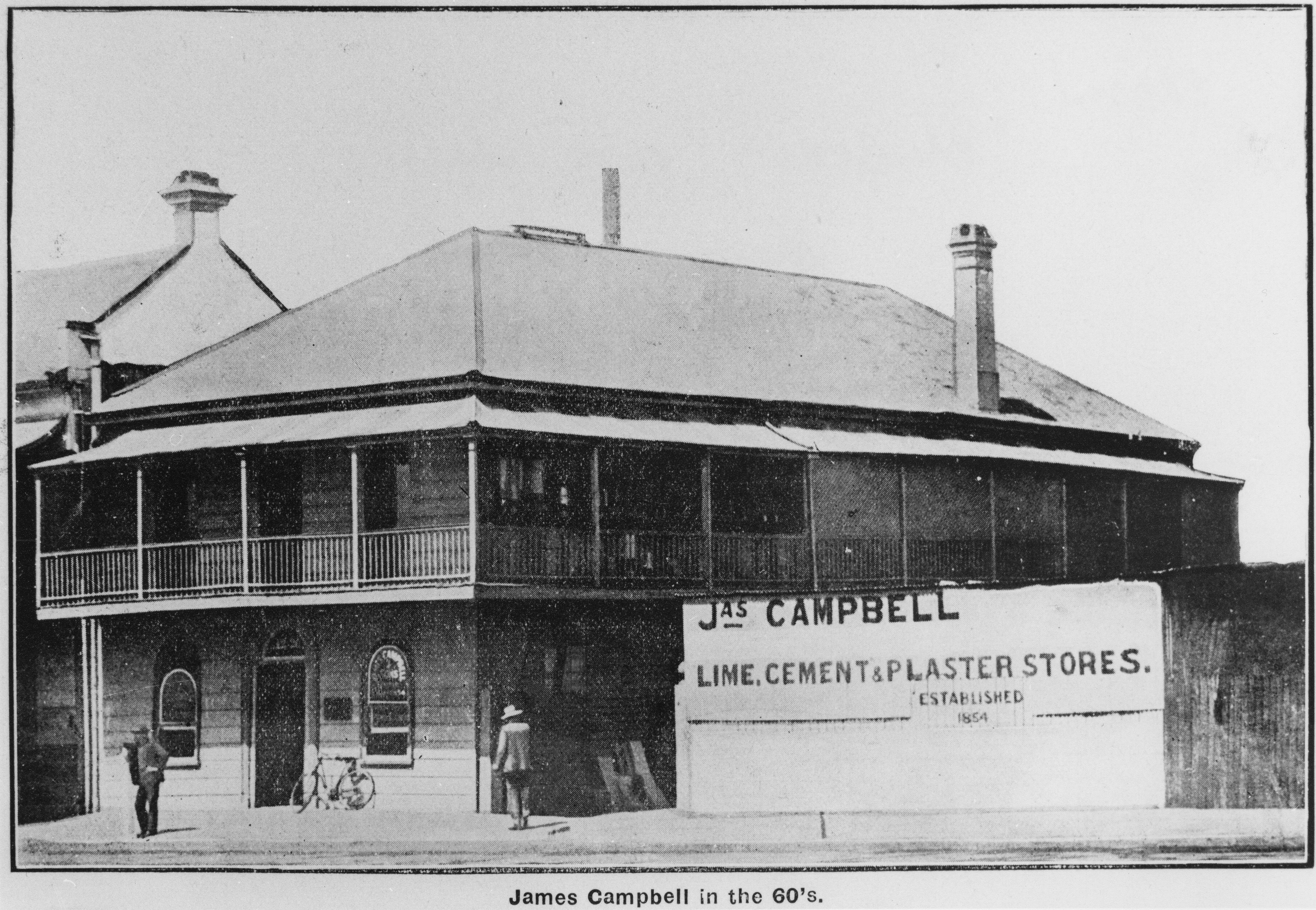
Lime Cement and plaster stores of James Campbell (probably Creek Street), circa 1865

James Campbell was born in 1830 in Perthshire, Scotland, and in his youth was apprenticed as a plasterer. He married Isabella Mitchell in February 1853 shortly before emigrating to Moreton Bay, where they arrived in June that year. Finding little employment in Brisbane for a plasterer, James opened a small store in George Street, retailing building materials obtained from Sydney. Moreton Bay was passing through a recession at this period, and Campbell's first venture failed. He took odd jobs – timbergetting, fencing, carpentering, painting, bricklaying - until in 1854 he was able to acquire land in Creek Street, at the corner of Charlotte Street, where he erected a single-storeyed building and commenced business as City Lime, Cement and Plaster Stores – the business which ultimately became James Campbell and Sons. Campbell's business prospered steadily through the 1850s and 1860s. In 1857 he bought additional land in Charlotte Street and in 1864 purchased 36 perches (910 m^{2}) in Creek Street, opposite the city wharves, where he erected a 2-storeyed timber store and residence which remained the firm's headquarters until replaced in 1909 by an imposing five-storeyed brick warehouse. From the early 1860s, Campbell is understood to have operated lime kilns at Breakfast Creek and Lytton, supplied with shell and coral collected from Moreton Bay by sub-contractors.

In the 1870s James Campbell entered the timber trade, and from this point the business prospered rapidly, particularly after his two eldest sons, John Dunmore Campbell (born 1854) and James Mitchell Campbell (born 1860), entered the family business. In the mid-1870s, Campbell established his own fleet of ships and acquired his first sawmill, at Capalaba Creek, in 1876. This was closed in 1881 when his Coochin Creek Sawmill (Campbellville) was established. Between 1876 and 1936 the firm bought and sold at least 11 sawmills in southeast Queensland.

The New Farm riverbank on which Campbell's lime kilns were established in the late 1870s was part of a larger parcel of land alienated in 1845 by John McConnel (of Cressbrook and later Durundur), who acquired most of the land south of Brunswick Street to the Brisbane River, between Kent and Sydney Streets - an area of almost 113 acres (46 ha). In the mid-1870s part of this land, Eastern Suburban Allotments 14 and 15 (by then owned by Frederick Hamilton Hart and William Henry Barker) were subdivided as the Langshaw Estate - marketed as prime residential real estate with frontages to the Brisbane River, Bowen Terrace and the New Farm Road (Brunswick Street), suitable for gentlemen's villa residences. It appears that Langshaw, Barker and Moray Streets were surveyed at this time, but they are not listed in the Brisbane Post Office Directories until 1883–84.

Between June 1876 and December 1878 James Campbell acquired title to subdivisions 47–50 of ESA 15 and subdivision 51 of ESA 15A, on the Langshaw Estate, all of which had frontages to the Brisbane River and Moray Street, below Langshaw Street. It is not known if any structures existed on these blocks at the time of purchase. In February 1877 Campbell wrote to the Brisbane Municipal Council, requesting permission to erect a lime kiln at Bowen Terrace, on the Langshaw Estate, and a year later raised a mortgage of £1,500 on the property from James Gibbon. He advertised the Langshaw Marble Lime Works in Pugh's Almanac of 1881, for the first time.

A c. 1890 sketch and an 1896 survey plan indicate that two D-shaped sets of kilns were constructed, but only the southern "D", comprising two kilns, currently survives. The two kilns comprising this southern set are constructed of different materials, with the stone kiln likely to pre-date the brick kiln. They may have functioned together as a pair of intermittent-firing kilns - one cooling and being drawn while the other was being charged and burnt. This was a simple and common form of burning lime, practised throughout the Australian colonies in the 19th century. Built into the side of the river embankment, limestone and fuel were layered alternately into each kiln from above, burnt for 3 days at 1,000 degrees Celsius, then allowed to cool ready for the drawing of the lime - a cycle of 6 or 7 days for each kiln in alternation.

In addition to the kilns, Campbell built a small wharf at the New Farm site, to which his ships transported limestone, and later timber, following the establishment of the Langshaw Planing Mills and Joinery Works on the property in 1882. These latter shipments included New Zealand White Pine from 1885 and Oregon Pine from 1887. A c. 1881 photograph shows the wharf extant.

In 1882 Campbell took his two eldest sons (John Dunmore and James Mitchell) into partnership as James Campbell and Sons. JD Campbell, (who from 1896 was chairman and managing director of James Campbell and Sons Ltd), supervised the Langshaw planing mills and lime works, and from at least 1883 he and his young family resided at Rocky Bank, overlooking the Brisbane River at New Farm, adjoining the mill and lime works on part of the land acquired by his father in the 1870s.

By the late 1880s, James Campbell and Sons had developed an extensive building supplies business which embraced timber, lime, brick, stone, asphalt, and hardware. In September 1883 they had acquired a half interest in George Fischer's Pottery at Albion (established c. 1861), the new firm being styled George Fischer & Co. - two years later they bought out Fischer and renamed the business the Albion Brick and Pottery Works. This was the start of Campbell's focus on Albion. In 1890, their Coochin Creek Sawmills were closed and an extensive new sawmill was opened at Albion, which became the focus of Campbell's sawmilling interests in Brisbane until the middle of the 20th century. The establishment of the Albion works, combined with the Australia-wide depression of the early 1890s and severe flooding of the Brisbane River in 1890 and 1893 - which caused extensive damage at Campbell's Creek Street warehouse and is likely to have inundated the New Farm lime kilns - resulted in the firm relinquishing the Langshaw property in the early 1890s. In June 1894 title passed to the Queensland National Bank, and three years later to Thomas William Hanmer, who held the interest in a £7,000 mortgage on the property taken out by James Campbell in 1886.

A search of the Brisbane Post Office Directories indicates that following James Campbell and Sons' removal c. 1894, the site of the former Langshaw mills and lime works remained unoccupied for about 20 years. A plan of Campbell's Wharf New Farm, thought to date to 1904, shows lime kiln ruins with an adjoining iron shed, a retaining wall at the high water mark with a short wharf, and remnants of the Langshaw Sawmill. In 1914 title passed to James Green, a Brisbane timber merchant, who had moved his Wickham Street business to the New Farm site by 1916. By 1921, Rosenfeld & Co. (Qld) Ltd, timber merchants, were operating a saw mill from this location, and title to the property passed to Julius Rosenfeld in January 1924. A disastrous fire in February 1931 destroyed the mill, and in 1933 Rosenfeld subdivided the land into residential allotments around a short cul-de-sac, Julius Street, which was dedicated by the Brisbane City Council in 1934. In 1935 a set of flats Aloha Court - later renamed Pine Lodge was erected on the subdivision containing the kilns, and at this time a garage associated with the flats was erected at the edge of the cliff, in part resting on the lime kiln remains.

James Campbell and Sons Ltd became one of the great success stories of locally derived Queensland commerce/industry. James Campbell died in 1904, James Mitchell Campbell in 1906 and John Dunmore Campbell in 1909, but the business was sustained and flourished through the first half of the 20th century by three generations of the Campbell family. In 1951 it became part of the Carrick group of companies, but retained the name of James Campbell and Sons. In 1954 the firm celebrated 100 years of trading, and survived into the 1990s as Campbell's Timber and Hardware, until absorbed into the BBC Hardware chain c. 1995.

== Description ==
The remains of the Langshaw Marble Lime Works' lime kilns are located on a level site fronting the Brisbane River to the west, at the base of a steep embankment below Pine Lodge. The site contains the remains of two lime kilns built into the steep embankment, with a level area extending to the river bank and remnants of a timber wharf adjacent.

The remains of the kilns, consisting of masonry walls and hearths, are constructed abutting each other forming a D-shaped plan, with the northern kiln constructed of porphyry and the southern of brick. The Pine Lodge garage has been constructed at the top of the embankment, with the rear of the structure surmounting the kilns.

The porphyry kiln has squared rubble coursing, with an arched hearth with three layers of bricks forming the extrados, and is currently used as an outdoor fireplace. The second kiln is constructed of English bond brickwork, and is mainly overgrown. The site also contains a number of mature trees.

A recently constructed tiered stone retaining wall is located at the river bank, and the remains of a number of timber piles from an early wharf are located adjacent.

== Heritage listing ==
Remains of the Langshaw Marble Lime Works was listed on the Queensland Heritage Register on 13 October 1997 having satisfied the following criteria.

The place is important in demonstrating the evolution or pattern of Queensland's history.

The remains of these late 1870s lime kilns survive as important evidence of lime manufacture in 19th century Queensland, illustrating the establishment and development of local industry, particularly that related to the building trade.

The place demonstrates rare, uncommon or endangered aspects of Queensland's cultural heritage.

Although by no means evidence of the earliest lime burning undertaken at Moreton Bay, they are rare surviving 19th century lime kiln remains which provide important information about the process and role of lime manufacture in Queensland, and have the potential to contribute to more exhaustive studies on these topics, to the analysis of kiln type, and to our general understanding of Queensland history.

The place has potential to yield information that will contribute to an understanding of Queensland's history.

Although by no means evidence of the earliest lime burning undertaken at Moreton Bay, they are rare surviving 19th century lime kiln remains which provide important information about the process and role of lime manufacture in Queensland, and have the potential to contribute to more exhaustive studies on these topics, to the analysis of kiln type, and to our general understanding of Queensland history.

The place has a special association with the life or work of a particular person, group or organisation of importance in Queensland's history.

The lime kiln remains are significant for their association with the work of the important early Queensland firm of James Campbell and Sons, whose building supplies business, established in 1854, survived into the late 20th century.
