= Jim Campbell =

Jim Campbell may refer to:

== Sports ==
- Jim Campbell (catcher) (born 1937), MLB (1962–63)
- Jim Campbell (pinch hitter) (born 1943), MLB (1970)
- Jim Campbell (pitcher) (born 1966), MLB (1990)
- Jim Campbell (ice hockey) (born 1973), American ice hockey player
- Jim Campbell (Australian footballer) (1886–1935)
- Jim Campbell (New Zealand footballer), New Zealand footballer

== Other ==
- Jim Campbell (baseball executive) (1924–1995), American baseball executive
- Jim Campbell (artist) (born 1956), American artist
- Jim Campbell (comics) (born 1977), American artist and musician
- Jim Campbell (comedian) (born 1982), English Comedian
- Jim Campbell (trade unionist) (1895–1957), Scottish trade unionist
- James P. Campbell, president and CEO of GE Consumer & Industrial

== See also ==
- James Campbell (disambiguation)
- Jimmy Campbell (disambiguation)
- Jamie Campbell (disambiguation)
- Kim Campbell (disambiguation)
