= Jimmy Campbell =

Jimmy Campbell may refer to:

- Jimmy Campbell (footballer, born 1886) (1886–1925), Scottish footballer
- Jimmy Campbell (footballer, born 1918) (1918–2011), Scottish footballer
- Jimmy Campbell (footballer, born 1921) (1921–2004), Scottish footballer
- Jimmy Campbell (footballer, born 1937) (1937–1994), English footballer
- Jimmy Campbell (fiddler) (1937–2022), Irish musician
- Jimmy Campbell (musician) (1944–2007), English singer-songwriter
- Jimmy Campbell (songwriter) (1903–1967), British songwriter and music publisher, known for his collaborations with Reg Connelly
- Jimmy Campbell (bowls), Canadian lawn bowls international

== See also ==
- James Campbell (disambiguation)
- Jim Campbell (disambiguation)
