= Kim Campbell (disambiguation) =

Kim Campbell (born 1947) served as prime minister of Canada from June to November 1993.

Kim Campbell may also refer to:

- Kim Campbell (pilot), (born 1975), retired United States Air Force officer and Command Pilot
- Kim Campbell, BBC television series Waterloo Road character

== See also ==
- Jim Campbell (disambiguation)
