= Martin R. P. McGuire =

American historian (1897–1969)

Martin Rawson Patrick McGuire (1897 - 15 March 1969) was an American classicist and the senior editor of The New Catholic Encyclopedia, for which he wrote 114 articles.

== Early life ==
Martin Rawson Patrick McGuire was born in 1897.

== Career ==
McGuire spent his whole career at The Catholic University of America, joining as a graduate assistant while he studied for his MA. He received his PhD there in 1927 for a dissertation on St. Ambrose. He became, in succession, ordinary professor, graduate dean, and chair of the Department of Greek and Latin from 1949 to 1962.

He was senior editor of The New Catholic Encyclopedia, for which he wrote 114 articles.

== Death ==
McGuire died on 15 March 1969.

== Selected publications ==
- Sancti S. Ambrosii De Nabuthae: A commentary &c., Washington D.C., 1927. (Translator) (Patristic Studies No. 15)
- The Confessions of St. Augustine: Books I-IX (Selections), Prentice-Hall, New York, 1931. (Introduction, notes and vocabulary, with James Marshall Campbell) (Reprinted by Bolchazy-Carducci Publishers, 1984, 2007).
- Introduction to classical scholarship: A syllabus and bibliographical guide, Catholic University of America Press, Washington D.C., 1961. (2nd edition 1968)
- Teaching Latin in the modern world, Catholic University of America Press, Washington D.C., 1961.
- The political and cultural history of the ancient world: A syllabus, with suggested readings, Catholic University of America Press, Washington D.C., 1961.
- Introduction to medieval Latin studies: A syllabus and bibliographical guide, 2nd edition, Catholic University of America Press, Washington D.C., 1977. ISBN 9780813205427 (With Hermigild Dressler)
