= James Edwin Campbell =

James Edwin Campbell may refer to:

- James E. Campbell (1843–1924), Democratic politician and Governor of Ohio
- James Edwin Campbell (poet) (1867–1896), African American poet, editor, writer and educator

== See also ==
- James Campbell (disambiguation)
