= Archibald H. Rowand Jr. =

Archibald Hamilton Rowand Jr.
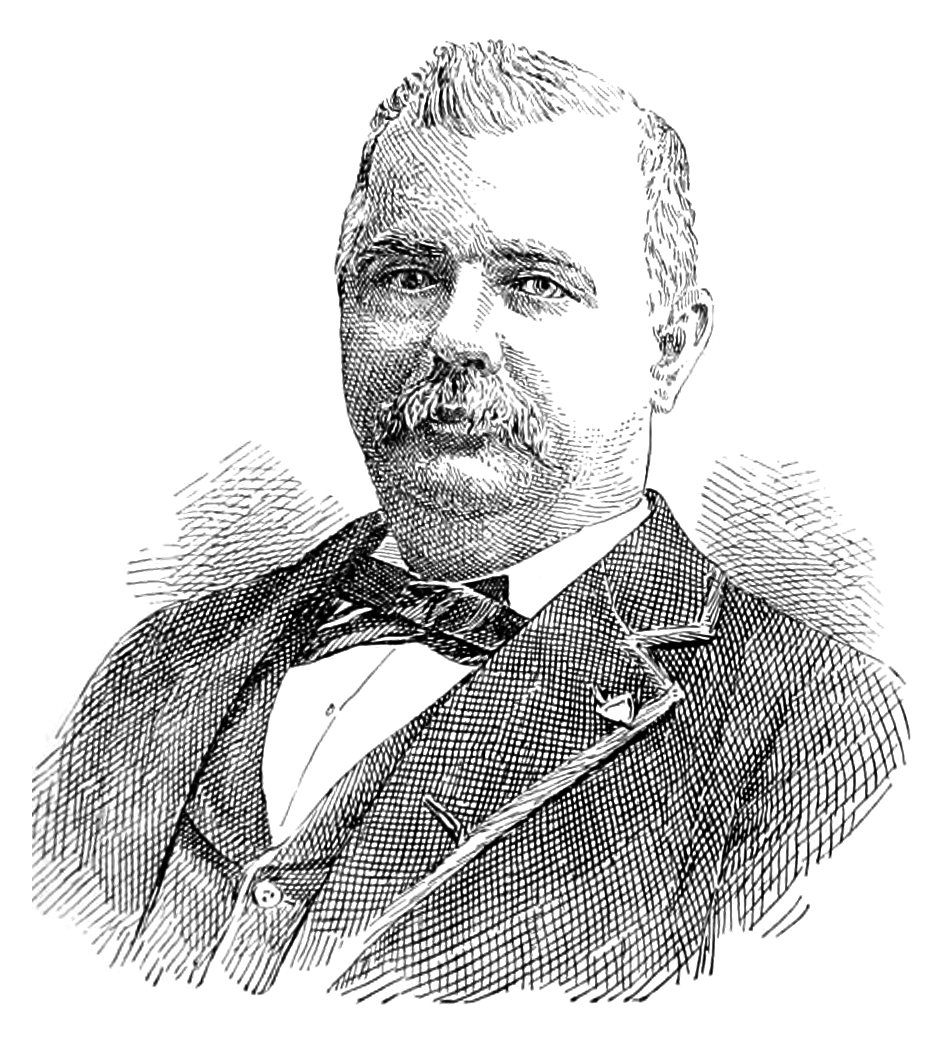
- Born: March 6, 1845; Allegheny City, Pennsylvania, US
- Died: December 15, 1913 (aged 68); Pittsburgh, Pennsylvania, US
- Burial place: Allegheny Cemetery, Pittsburgh, Pennsylvania
- Military career
- Allegiance: United States
- Branch: US Army
- Rank: Private
- Units: Company K, 1st West Virginia Volunteer Cavalry Regiment
- Conflicts: American Civil War
- Awards: Medal of Honor

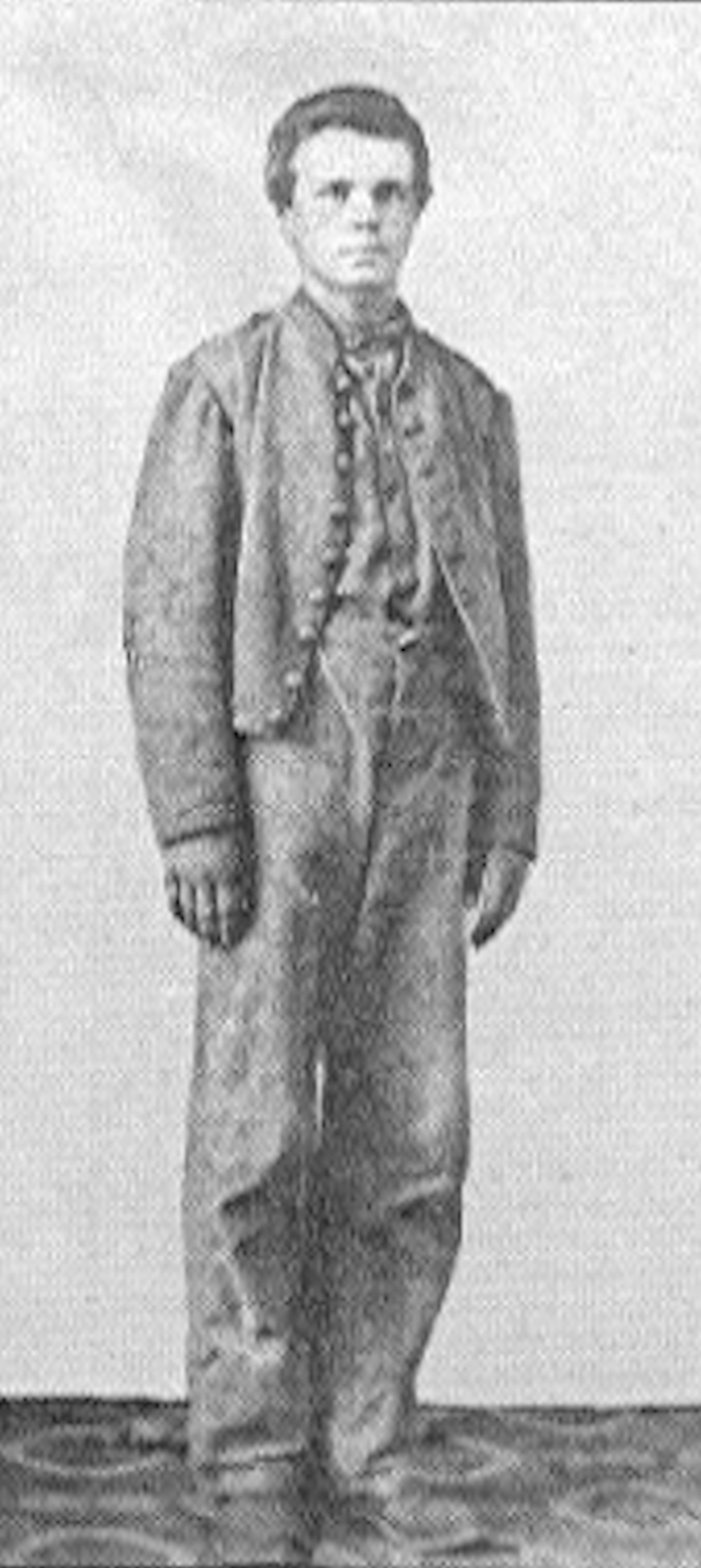
Medal of Honor winner Archibald Hamilton Rowand Jr, circa 1865

Archibald Hamilton Rowand Jr. (March 6, 1845 – December 15, 1913) was a United States soldier who fought with the Union Army as a member of Company K, 1st West Virginia Volunteer Cavalry Regiment during the American Civil War. He received his nation's highest award for bravery during combat, the U.S. Medal of Honor, for "extraordinary heroism" during the winter of 1864–1865. That award was conferred on March 3, 1873.

== Formative years ==
Born on March 6, 1845, in Allegheny City, Pennsylvania (now a part of Pittsburgh), Archibald Hamilton Rowand Jr. was a son of Camden, New Jersey, native Archibald Hamilton Rowand, Sr. (1820–1891) and Catherine Parkhill (Greer) Rowand (1825–1910), a native of Philadelphia County, Pennsylvania. He and his siblings, Asaph Terry (1843–1927), Frank Parkhill (1849–1920), Thomas Arthur, and Kate Fleming Rowand, were reared and educated in Pennsylvania's Pittsburgh region.

In 1860, Arch Rowand resided in Allegheny City with his parents and two other siblings. Their lives were comfortable. The real estate and personal property of their father, a successful bookbinder, were valued by the federal census taker that year at $8,000; as a result the family was able to employ a live-in servant.

== Civil War ==
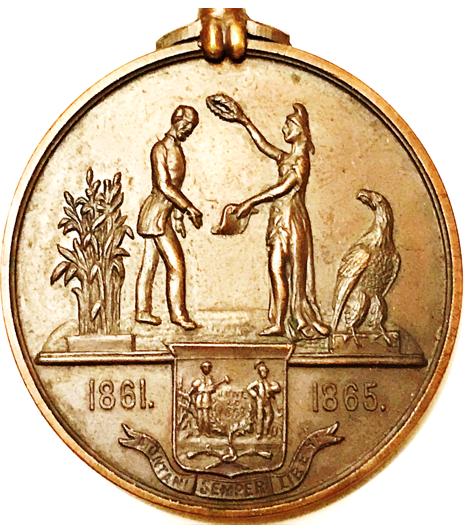
Honorable discharge medal, West Virginia (general image).

At the time of his enlistment for Civil War military service during the summer of 1862, Arch Rowand was employed as an auditor's clerk for the Fort Wayne and Chicago Railroad's branch office in Pittsburgh. After making the decision to enroll at Wheeling, West Virginia, he did so on July 17, and then officially mustered in as a Private with Company K, 1st West Virginia Volunteer Cavalry. According to Mark Roth, the former assistant managing editor of Pittsburgh's Post-Gazette, Rowand "was too young to enlist in Pennsylvania, so he signed up with a cavalry company in Wheeling ... that was being organized by his uncle, Thomas Weston Rowand, a Mexican War veteran."

In an interview in later life, Rowand said of his service tenure: "It was my duty to be in every engagement in which my regiment participated, and I was in every one with Sheridan, from the time he came into Shenandoah Valley until the wind-up at Appomattox." The first of his regiment's early engagements was the First Battle of Kernstown, Virginia (March 23, 1862). Afterward, according to Roth, senior Union military leaders grew to appreciate Rowand's intellect and courage, and began assigning him to scout and spy duties. In April 1863, while engaged with his regiment in combat near Fisher's Hill and Strasburg:

Rowand and two fellow soldiers ran into a Confederate advance guard and, after skirmishing with them, drove them back to the main group of about 125 Confederate troops, at which point they had to retreat themselves "to our main body numbering 60 men of the third W.Va. Cav. under Maj. McGee."

McGee ... ordered a charge, but none of his men would follow him, so "at first six of us followed him right into the enemy, they being stretched across the road and field; we charged into them headed by the gallant Maj.

"We broke their ranks [and] they had started to retreat when 20 men of the third W.Va. coming up, the retreat became a rout, the rebels flying in every direction.... In the charge we lost two of our best men. Corp. Cashman was shot in the pit of the stomach, George Greene through the heart. Orderly Smith's horse was shot in three places, Maj. McGee's horse in the foreshoulder. I luckily escaped unharmed although in the thickest of the fight."

An intense series of combat experiences then followed with: the Battle of Hanover (June 30, 1863) and Battle of Gettysburg (July 1–3, 1863) in Pennsylvania; the battles of Hagerstown (July 6–16, 1863) and Boonsboro (July 8, 1863) in Maryland; the Mine Run Campaign in Virginia (November 27 to December 2, 1863); the battles of Cove Mountain (May 10, 1864), Lynchburg (June 17–18, 1864), Rutherford's Farm (July 20, 1864), and Kernstown II (July 24, 1864); and the Union Army's tide-turning Shenandoah Valley Campaign, which was spearheaded by Major-General Philip Sheridan during the late summer and fall of 1864, and included the battles of Moorefield (August 7), Opequon/Third Winchester (September 19), Fisher's Hill (September 21–22), and Cedar Creek (October 19). Then, during the winter of 1865 while serving with his regiment in the Shenandoah Valley, Rowand performed the act of valor which resulted in his being awarded the U.S. Medal of Honor:

With nothing on but their dripping undershirts, Rowand and James A. Campbell [rode 145 miles and hiked 11], until they encountered a detachment of Union troops near Harrison's Landing on the James River [where they had been ordered to proceed in order to deliver critical intelligence information to General Ulysses S. Grant].... Tucked inside Campbell's cheek, wrapped inside a ball of foil, was a strip of tissue paper with important tactical information from Sheridan.... As Grant and his party sat down for a late supper at City Point, Va., on that Sunday evening, a waiter came into the mess room and told Grant that a man was outside who wanted to see him and him only.... After Porter took Campbell's message to Grant, the general began to question him.... [Afterward], they gratefully accepted clean clothing and real beds. The next day, they were given fresh horses and uniforms, and set out to meet up with Sheridan at White House, Va.

As the war progressed to its final conclusion, he and his fellow 1st West Virginians saw still more action during the late winter and early spring of 1865 as part of the Appomattox Campaign, including the battles of: Dinwiddie Court House (March 31), Five Forks (April 1), Sailor's Creek (April 6), Appomattox Station (April 8), and Appomattox Court House (April 9), which culminated in the surrender of the Confederate States Army by General-in-Chief Robert E. Lee. Reflecting further on his experiences, Rowand noted in 1893:

Fortunately, I contracted no disease while in the army, neither was I at any time badly wounded. As a matter of fact, I was too skinny to stop a bullet. I had holes bored through my hat, and was shot through my clothes several times; had eight horses killed under me during service in action, and escaped with a badly bruised knee, received by the falling of a horse which was shot. I am one of the thankful fellows.

== Postwar life ==
Following his honorable discharge from the military, Rowand resumed his job as a railroad bookkeeper before taking a position as the chief accountant for the Allegheny Valley Railroad Company prior to marrying Sarah Martha Chandler Howard (1842–1913), a native of Rochester Junction, New York and daughter of a steel baron. Wed on October 17, 1867, the couple soon welcomed the births of children: Mary Kate (1869–1934), who was born on February 9, 1869; Harry, who was born circa 1871; Sallie; Helen (1880–1911), who was born on August 11, 1880; Archibald Sheridan (circa 1876–1940); and Eliza Jeannette (1884–1920), who was born in Verona, Pennsylvania, on February 24, 1884.

In 1880, a federal census taker documented that he and his wife resided in Verona with their children, Mary, Harry and Arch, and that the elder Archibald was employed as a bookkeeper for the Clerk of Courts. The Pittsburgh Dispatch and other publications of the period confirm that he was far more than a bookkeeper, however, noting that he was elected to the post of Clerk of the Courts for Allegheny County, and served a total of two terms between 1878 and 1885. Appointed to the Pennsylvania State Bar in 1885, he then began to practice both civil and criminal law.

In 1906, he was described as "a prominent lawyer in Pittsburg" [sic] by General Horace Porter in his book, Campaigning with Grant. The following year, on July 27, he was awarded a U.S. Civil War Pension at the rate of $12 per month. Still practicing law in 1910, he and his wife were empty nesters living in Pittsburgh's 5th Ward. A domestic employee resided with them.

== Death and interment ==
Preceded in death by his parents and daughter Helen, Rowand died in Pittsburgh on December 15, 1913, and was laid to rest at that city's Allegheny Cemetery.

News of his passing was reported via the Associated Press and newspapers nationwide, including the December 16 edition of The San Francisco Call under the headline, "Sheridan Scout Dead", Cambridge, Maryland's The Daily Banner, Connecticut's Norwich Bulletin, and Canfield, Ohio's The Mahoning Dispatch.

== Medal of Honor citation ==
The President of the United States of America, in the name of Congress, takes pleasure in presenting the Medal of Honor to Private Archibald Hamilton Rowand Jr., United States Army, for extraordinary heroism, Winter 1864-1865, while serving with Company K, 1st West Virginia Cavalry, in action at Columbia to Richmond, Virginia. Private Rowand was one of two men who succeeded in getting through the enemy's lines with dispatches to General Grant.

== See also ==
- James A. Campbell (Medal of Honor)
- Francis M. Cunningham
- List of American Civil War Medal of Honor recipients: Q–S
