= Jim Campbell (Australian footballer) =

Australian rules footballer

Personal information
- Full name: James Douglas Campbell
- Born: 23 March 1886; Essendon, Victoria
- Died: 16 January 1935 (aged 48); Carlton, Victoria
- Original team: Preston

Playing career^{1}
Years	Club	Games (Goals)
1908	Essendon	1 (0)
- ^{1} Playing statistics correct to the end of 1908.

James Douglas Campbell (23 March 1886 – 16 January 1935) was an Australian rules footballer who played with Essendon in the Victorian Football League (VFL).
