= James Campbell (surgeon) =

English surgeon (1787–1818)

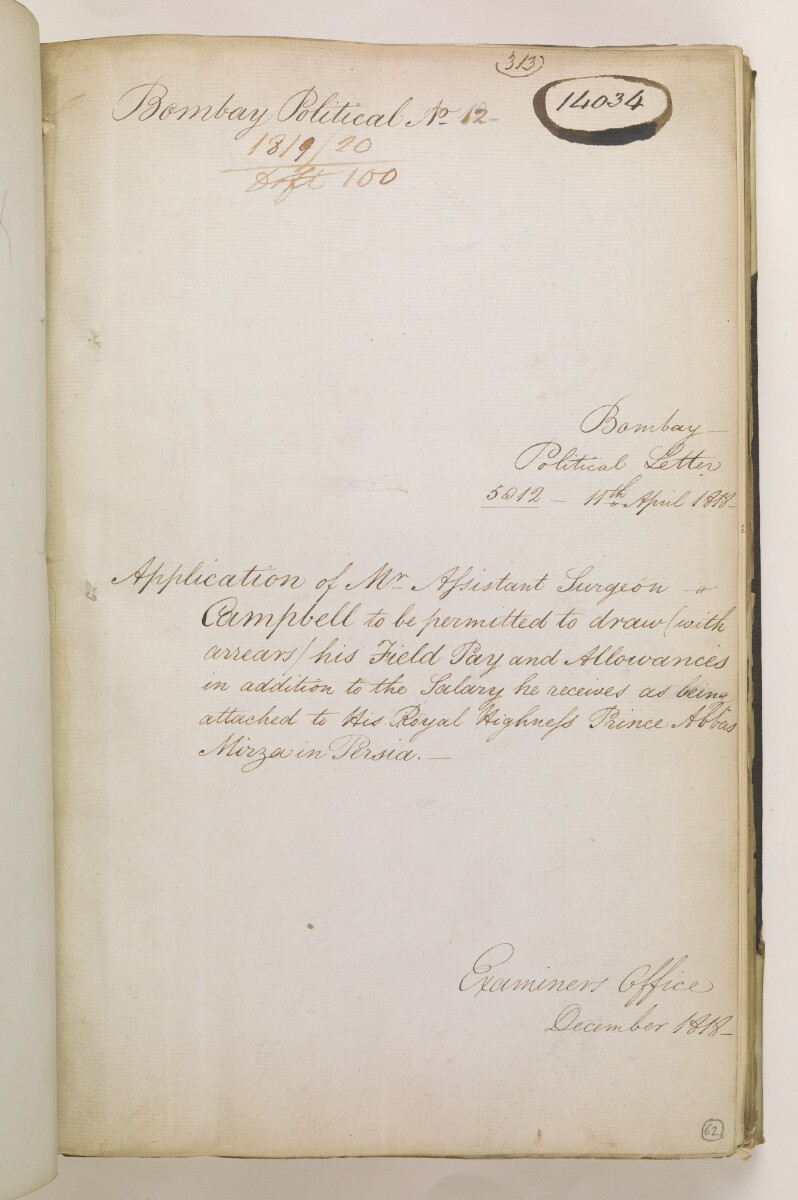
Application by Campbell to be permitted to draw (with arrears) his field pay and allowances in addition to the salary he receives as being attached to Abbas Mirza, Crown Prince of Iran

James Drummond Campbell (1787–1818) was a 19th-century English Assistant Surgeon, who served as a medical officer and member of the 1808 British Harford Jones mission to Qajar Iran. From 1808 until 1818 he was part of the Bombay Medical Service.

Campbell was assigned to the Iranian army for some time under Qajar Crown Prince Abbas Mirza in Tabriz. He successfully treated Abbas Mirza of a sexually transmitted infection, but also, after agreeance of the Crown Prince, vaccinated his entire household against smallpox. From this point onwards, Abbas Mirza were to be indefinitely attended by a foreign doctor. Campbell died in Tehran and left an illegitimate son named Alexander who also served in the Bombay Medical Service.
