= James Marshall Campbell =

James Marshall Campbell (1895-1977) was dean of the college of arts and sciences at The Catholic University of America. Campbell was a classical scholar, and a member of the department of Greek and Latin. He was on the faculty of the Catholic University from 1945-1966.

== Selected publications ==
- The influence of the second sophistic on the style of the sermons of St. Basil the Great, Catholic University of America, Washington D.C., 1922. (Patristic Studies Vol. 2)
- The Greek fathers, Longmans, Green, London, 1929.
- The Confessions of St. Augustine: Books I-IX (Selections), Prentice-Hall, New York, 1931. (Introduction, notes and vocabulary, with Martin R.P. McGuire) (Reprinted by Bolchazy-Carducci Publishers, 1984, 2007).
- A Concordance of Prudentius, Mediaeval Academy of America, Cambridge: Mass., 1932. (With Roy Joseph Deferrari)
