= Jimmy Campbell (footballer, born 1918) =

Scottish footballer

Personal information
- Full name: James Campbell
- Date of birth: 25 November 1918
- Place of birth: Bridgeton, Scotland
- Date of death: 12 January 2011 (aged 92)
- Place of death: Glasgow, Scotland
- Position: Outside forward

Senior career*
Years	Team	Apps	(Gls)
–1938	St Mungo Juniors		
1938–	Celtic	0	(0)
- → Aldershot (guest)
- → Folkestone Town (guest)
- → Clapton Orient (guest)
- → Chelsea (guest)
- → Partick Thistle (guest)
–1943	→ St Anthony's (guest)		
1943–	Leicester City	0	(0)
- Aston Villa
1946–1947	Walsall	14	(1)
1947–1951	Nuneaton Borough		
- * Club domestic league appearances and goals

James Campbell (25 November 1918 – 12 January 2011) was a Scottish amateur footballer who played in the Football League for Walsall. After his retirement as a player, he coached Reading, Motherwell and St Johnstone.

== Personal life ==
Campell was the song of former Reading footballer James Campbell. Campbell was educated at Bernard Street School and Whitehill Secondary School in Glasgow and the University of Birmingham. During the Second World War, he served in the Royal Army Dental Corps, the Army Physical Training Corps, trained the French Resistance and acted as a bodyguard for Hardy Amies. He married in 1943 and was the grandfather of actor Scott Speedman. After the war, Campbell established a dental practice in Glasgow and joined Glasgow Dental Hospital and School.

== Career statistics ==
Appearances and goals by club, season and competition
Club	Season	League			FA Cup		Total	
Club	Season	Division	Apps	Goals	Apps	Goals	Apps	Goals
Leicester City	1945–46	―			1	0	1	0
Career total			0	0	1	0	1	0

== Honours ==
Nuneaton Borough

- Birmingham Senior Cup: 1947–48
- Atherstone Nursing Cup: 1947–48
- Nuneaton Hospital Cup: 1947–48
