= James Campbell (comedian) =

British stand-up comedian

James Campbell is a British stand-up comedian.

== Information ==
As of 2005, Campbell has been running comedy workshops in London for would-be comedians between the ages of seven and thirteen. These children are then given the opportunity of performing open spots in his Comedy4Kids shows.

He has also performed in front of Queen Elizabeth II of the United Kingdom and in the Albert Hall.

Campbell has also written a play, The Onomatopoeia Society (a play about a group of squiggles, who are paid to collect dung), which was performed at the 2005 Edinburgh Festival Fringe.

In 2008, Campbell had a brief role in an experiment on Laughter on the BBC1 show, Child of Our Time. In October 2011, he appeared on the CBBC children's programme Blue Peter, teaching children how to do jokes.

He has also signed a deal with Hodder children's books for a new series of books called Boyface, about a child called Boyface Antelope, the series will be released later in 2013.

== Discography ==
- Comedy 4 Kids
- The epic saga of the Microwave frog (James's first novel)
- The Tales Of Creamy Mouse (a children's novel, parodying The Canterbury Tales)
- The Wimpety Wam(a sequel to The tales of creamy mouse, but aimed at a younger age group)
- Cutlery Wars
- The Onomatopoeia Society (a satirical novel for children)
- Fat Round Cat (a children's novel, first published in 2002)
- A desaise (a horror-comedy children's novel)
- Boyface (not yet published)

== Recycled jokes ==
Many jokes appear many times in Campbell's; events, shows and books, these include:

- Grand Theft tractor. A story in which the characters of Grand Theft auto go out looking for adventure, and accidentally get a job on a farm
- When advertising, he uses slogans like; if your parents don't buy my new book for you, it's obviously because they don't love you and if you don't buy my new CD, your eyes will fall out and monsters will eat you
- The magical sock of Loch Negoch. A song in which a man tries to find the Loch Ness monster, but he ends up in Loch Negoch, where an evil magical sock lives.
