= James Dykes Campbell =

Scottish merchant and writer

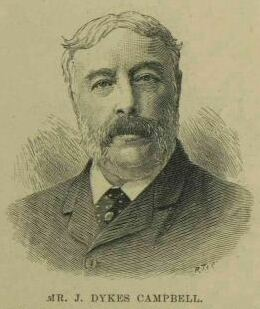
James Dykes Campbell

James Dykes Campbell (2 November 1838, Port Glasgow – 1 June 1895) was a Scottish merchant and writer, best known for editing and writing the life of Samuel Taylor Coleridge. His biography has been described as "a landmark in the history of the genre in that it defines the standards of scholarship, accuracy, documentation, and impartiality by which every biographer of Coleridge has since been measured."

== Life ==
Educated at the burgh school at Port Glasgow, James Dykes Campbell left school at fourteen and entered the office of a local merchant. On his father's death in 1854 the family moved to Glasgow, where he worked for the pottery manufacturer R. Cochrane & Co. Representing his company on an 1860 voyage to Toronto, he met academics there including Edwin Hatch. In 1862 he privately published an edition of those early poems of Tennyson which Tennyson had suppressed or revised in later editions of his work; Tennyson obtained an injunction to stop the London publisher John Camden Hotten selling the book. Returning to Glasgow in 1862, Campbell continued in business but became a prolific contributor to Notes and Queries, writing over seventy contributions between February 1863 and February 1866. In 1864 Campbell privately printed extracts from a manuscript which he believed contained essays contributed by Joseph Addison to The Spectator.

In 1866, Campbell joined a Mauritius mercantile firm, from where he would travel to Bombay and Australia, but kept up literary study and correspondence. In 1875, he married Mary Sophia Chesney, daughter of General F. R. Chesney. By 1881 he could afford to retire from business and return to England. In London, he befriended Bryan Waller Proctor's widow Anne Proctor, Robert Browning, Alfred Ainger and Arthur Symons. Though Campbell was not given the chance to be editor of Thomas Lovell Beddoes, he made a careful transcription of Beddoes's manuscripts – then in Browning's possession, though subsequently lost – which is now in the Bodleian Library.

Campbell worked on Coleridge for a decade, leaving London for St Leonards in 1889 for the sake of his wife's health. He based his 1893 edition of Coleridge's poetry upon the 1829 edition of Coleridge's poems, rather than the 1834 edition accepted by Ernest Hartley Coleridge and many later scholars. The introduction to Campbell's edition appeared the following year, revised and enlarged, as Samuel Taylor Coleridge: A Narrative of the Events of His Life:

My aim has been, not to add to the ever-lengthening array of estimates of Coleridge as a poet and philosopher, but to provide something which appeared to be wanting – a plain, and as far as possible, an accurate narrative of the events of his life. Explanations have been offered when such seemed necessary or desirable, but comment, especially moralising, has been studiously avoided.

Campbell died of heart failure on 1 June 1895, and was buried in the churchyard at Frant. Leslie Stephen provided an obituary for the Athenaeum, and in 1896 Macmillan republished Campbell's biography of Coleridge introduced by Stephen's memoir. Another friend, W. Hale White, saw a facsimile edition of some Coleridge manuscripts through the press in 1899.

== Works ==
- (ed.) Alfred Tennyson, Poems MDCCCXXX. MDCCCXXXIII, N.p., 1862
- (ed.) Some Portions of Essays Contributed to The Spectator by Mr. Joseph Addison: Now First Printed from His Ms. Notebook, Glasgow: Printed for J. D. Campbell by Bell & Bain, 1864
- (ed.) The Poetical Works of Samuel Taylor Coleridge, with a biographical introduction, London: Macmillan, 1893
- Samuel Taylor Coleridge: A Narrative of the Events of His Life, London & New York: Macmillan, 1894. Republished, with a memoir of Campbell by Leslie Stephen, London & New York: Macmillan, 1896.
- (ed.) Coleridge's Poems: A Facsimile Reproduction of Proofs and Mss. of Some of the Poems with Preface and Notes by W. Hale White, London: Constable, 1899
- (ed.) Charles Lamb: Specimens of English Dramatic Poets Who Lived about the Time of Shakespeare, with Extracts from the Garrick Plays, London: Routledge, 1907
