= John McConnel =

Australian politician

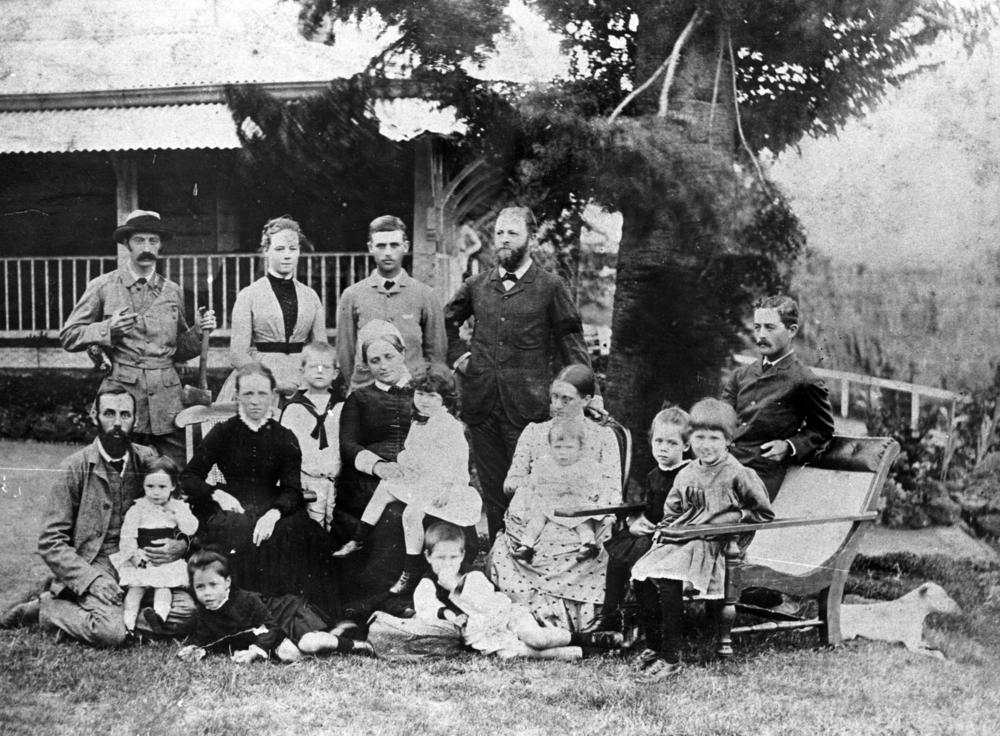
- McConnel family at Cressbrook Station, ca. 1887

Member of the Queensland Legislative Council
- In office 24 April 1861 – 16 July 1868

Personal details
- Born: John McConnel; 3 October 1806 Ardwick, Manchester, England
- Died: 27 January 1899 (aged 92) Lutwyche, Queensland, Australia
- Resting place: Bald Hills Cemetery
- Spouse: Amelia Elizabeth Burring
- Occupation: Station owner

John McConnel (3 October 1806 – 27 January 1899) was pastoralist and politician in Queensland, Australia. He was a Member of the Queensland Legislative Council.

== Pastoralist ==
On 1 January 1851 McConnell joined in partnership with his brother David and they purchased Durundur Station, previously belonging to the Archer brothers, who moved to the Burnett region. In 1851 the McConnels owned 400 cattle and 10,000 sheep on their Brisbane River Valley properties.

== Politics ==
McConnel was appointed to the Queensland Legislative Council on 24 April 1861 and served until his resignation on 16 July 1868.

== Later life ==
He died in 1899 and was buried in Bald Hills Cemetery.
