= James P. Campbell =

James P. Campbell is the president and Chief Executive Officer of GE Consumer & Industrial since November 2005. He lives in Louisville, Kentucky

== Education ==
Campbell earned a B.S. degree in Marketing from St. John's University and an M.B.A. in Marketing Management from Hofstra University.

== General Electric ==
Campbell joined GE in 1981 as a Sales/Marketing trainee in GE Appliances' Northeast Region. He quickly moved into management roles as an area sales leader, merchandising manager and regional sales manager. Following his field experience, Campbell moved in 1992 to GE Appliances' Louisville headquarters to become Manager, Microwave Cooking Products and Product Manager, Built-In Cooking Products. He was appointed vice president of Sales and Marketing and a GE Company Officer in 1999 and two years later was named president and chief executive officer of GE Appliances. In September 2002, when GE merged its appliances and lighting businesses, he assumed the role of president and chief executive officer of GE Consumer Products. Following the merger of GE Consumer Products and GE Industrial Systems in January 2004, Campbell became president and chief executive officer of GE Consumer & Industrial-Americas, a $9 billion division. In that role, he directed the manufacture, marketing and sale of appliances, lighting and industrial products across North and South America.

== Other ==
Campbell is on the boards of the National Electrical Manufacturers Association (NEMA) and the Frazier International History Museum and is an active member of the Louisville GE Volunteers chapter. Campbell and his wife have two children. They reside in Louisville, Kentucky.
