= James Campbell (timber merchant) =

Australian politician

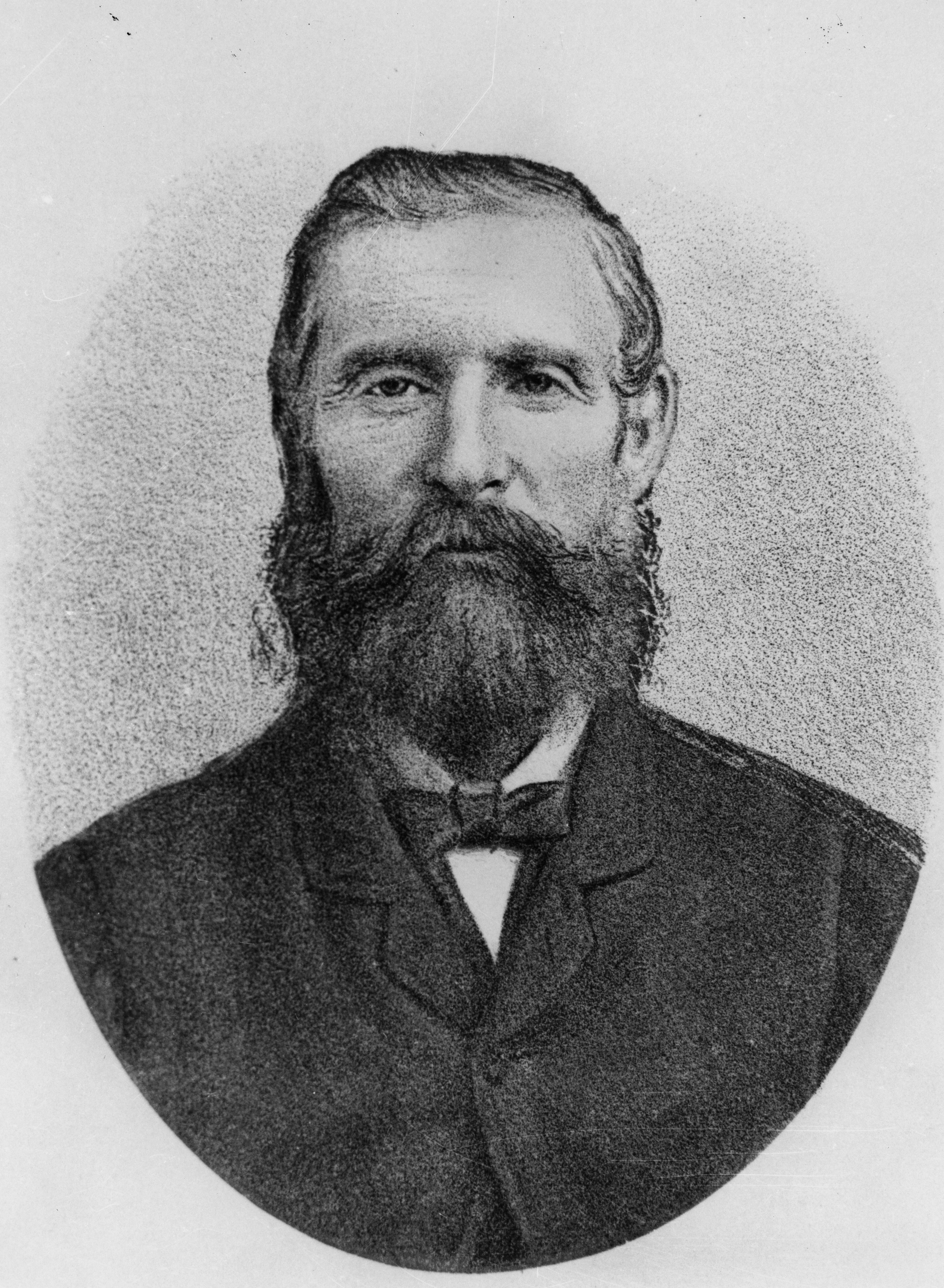
James Campbell, timber merchant of Brisbane

James Campbell (1830–1904) was a Scottish merchant of timber and other building products based in Brisbane, Queensland, Australia. He founded the hardware firm James Campbell and Sons.

== Early life ==
James Campbell was born on 6 March 1830 at Auchterarder, Perthshire, Scotland. His parents had hoped he would become a Church of Scotland minister, but he apprenticed himself at an early age to a plasterer and worked at that trade for some years. Having decided to emigrate, he was influenced by John Dunmore Lang to travel to Queensland. He married Mary Isabella Mitchell at Callander, Perthshire, in February 1853 and they arrived in Moreton Bay on 23 June 1853 on the John Fielden.

== Business ==
In Brisbane, Campbell established a business in George Street initially selling building materials imported from Sydney. Although that first venture failed, he started a new business City Lime, Cement and Plaster Stores on the corner of Creek and Charlotte Streets. Eventually he was providing many of the materials needed for constructing buildings, including timber, bricks, cement and pottery which were made locally, along with imported items.

From the early 1860s, Campbell was operating lime kilns at Breakfast Creek and Lytton using shells and coral collected from Moreton Bay. Around 1880, he established the Langshaw Marble Lime Works at New Farm.

James Campbell had a sawmill at Creek Street in Brisbane. Logs were cut in the Blackall Range and upper Caboolture River and hauled to Mellum Creek from where they were rafted down the Pumicestone Passage to the Creek Street sawmill. In 1881, James Campbell decided to establish a sawmill on the Coochin Creek near the confluence with Mellum Creek, from where the sawn timber was transported to Brisbane, initially via sailing cutter and from 1883 by paddlesteamer. The township of Campbellville (26°52′28″S 153°02′16″E) of around 100 people developed around the sawmill. There was a wharf with cranes and a provisional school and cemetery. Campbellville lasted until 1890 when the mill closed down. By that time, the North Coast railway line had made it easier to transport logs and timber by rail than by ship. Eventually Campbell owned sawmills at a number of locations in South-East Queensland and had a number of ships to carry the timber to his wharf and warehouse at Creek Street.

Campbell purchased a white sandstone quarry at Albion, Brisbane from John Petrie and built a brick and pottery works immediately north of Crosby Park.

== Politics ==
Campbell served as an alderman on the Brisbane Town Council and also as a council member of the Ithaca Shire. Although he did not serve in the Queensland Parliament, he took a strong interest in politics and was one of those who persuaded Charles Lilley to contest the seat of Fortitude Valley. His son John Dunmore Campbell served in the Queensland Legislative Assembly as the member for Moreton.

== Family ==
All of his five sons (John Dunmore, James Mitchell, Henry Edwin, George Peter and Charles William) became members of the business which was renamed James Campbell and Sons in 1882. Campbell was also well-connected through his daughters' marriages: Isabella Annie to William Aplin (Member of the Queensland Legislative Council), Jessie Banister to Robert Philp (Premier of Queensland), and Helen Morrison to James Forsyth (Member of the Queensland Legislative Assembly for Carpentaria, Moreton and Murrumba).

== Later life ==
Campbell died on 11 April 1904 at his home Camona in Kelvin Grove, Brisbane aged 74 years. He died four or five months after failing to recover from an attack of influenza. He was buried at Toowong Cemetery on 12 April 1904. He had requested that there be no religious service. However, his employees decided to congregate at the Normanby Fiveways from where they joined with the funeral party to the cemetery, where his friend Samuel Wood Brooks, a journalist, delivered a eulogy at the graveside.

His wife Isabella died on 24 February 1918 and was buried with him on 25 February 1918.
