= James A. Campbell (Medal of Honor) =

James Alexander Campbell
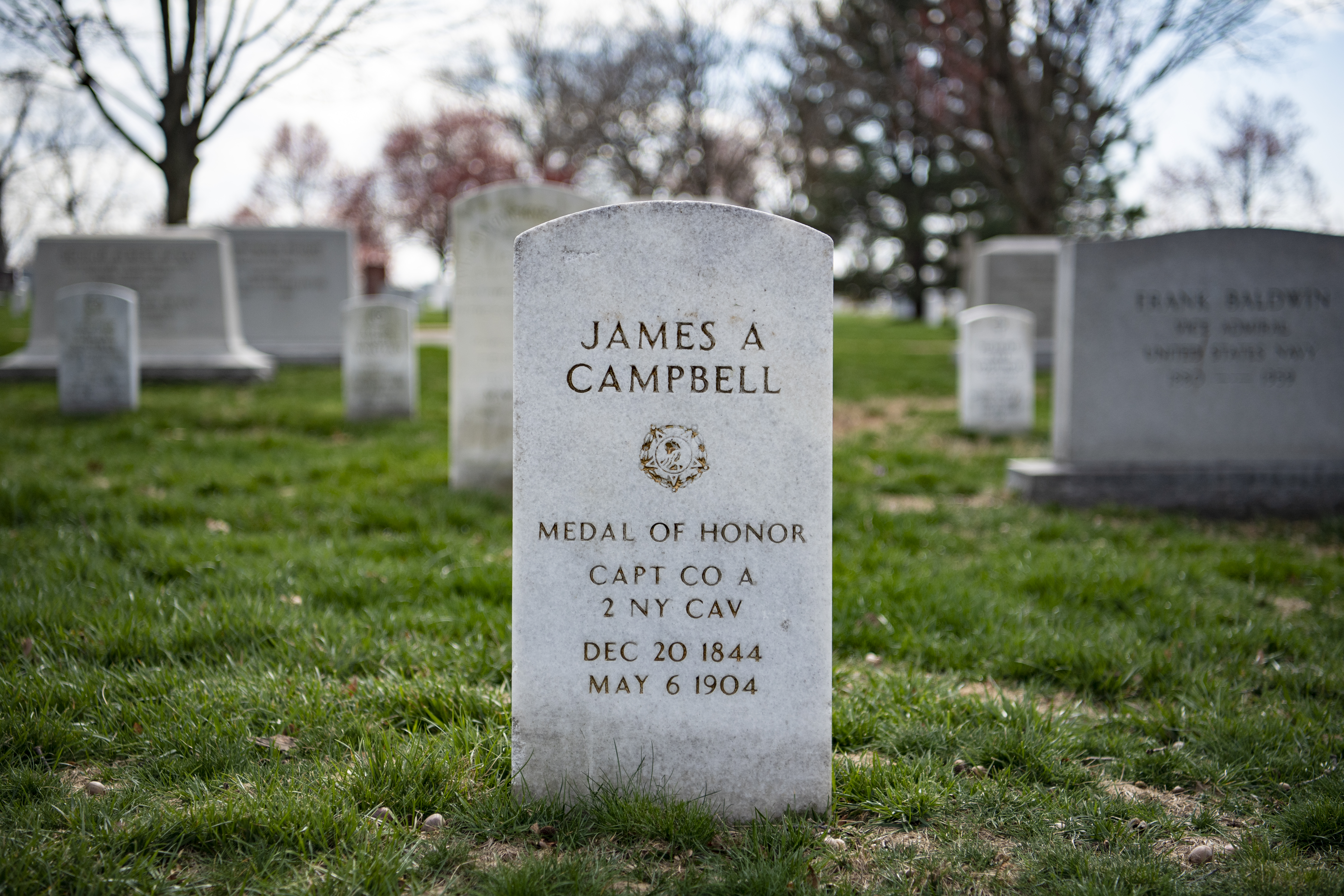
- Grave at Arlington National Cemetery
- Born: December 20, 1844; New York, New York
- Died: May 6, 1904 (aged 59); Fort Snelling, Minnesota
- Burial place: Arlington National Cemetery
- Military career
- Allegiance: United States of America
- Branch: United States Army
- Rank: Private
- Units: (New York (state)) 2nd Regiment New York Volunteer Cavalry - Companies A and C
- Conflicts: American Civil War
- Awards: Medal of Honor

James Alexander Campbell (December 20, 1844 – May 6, 1904) was a United States soldier who fought with the Union Army as a member of Companies A and C of the 2nd New York Cavalry Regiment during the American Civil War. He received his nation's highest award for bravery during combat, the U.S. Medal of Honor, for his action at Woodstock in Virginia on January 22, 1865 and at Amelia Courthouse in Virginia on April 5, 1865. That award was conferred on October 30, 1897.

In describing Campbell's patriotism and valor, Union Major-General Philip Sheridan said, "This country will never know how much it owes to James A. Campbell."

== Formative years ==
Campbell was born in New York City on December 20, 1844.

== Civil War ==
US Medal Of Honor (1862), United States Army Institute of Heraldry.

Campbell enlisted for Civil War military service at the age of 21. Military records at the time described him as a native of New York who was employed as a seaman, and was 5'6" tall with light hair, brown eyes and a fair complexion. After enrolling in Kings County, New York, on September 8, 1862, he was officially mustered in as a private with Company A of the 2nd New York Cavalry that day.

An intense series of military engagements then followed with operations: at South Mountain, Maryland (September 14) and Goose Creek (September 17); in the vicinity of Leesburg, Virginia (September 16–19); at Warrenton (September 29), Dumfries (October 5), Hazel River (October 7), Aldie and Mountains (October 31); at Sudley Church, New Baltimore, Salem, Warrenton and Upperville (November 3–4); and at Rappahannock Station (November 8–9), Aldie (November 25), and Stafford Court House (December 7) before Campbell fought with his regiment in the Battle of Fredericksburg from December 12 through 15.

Following time in winter quarters, Campbell saw his next period of increased activity beginning with regimental operations at Rappahannock Station on April 14, 1863. Engaged in Stoneman's raid|Stoneman's Raid from April 27 to May 8, the 2nd New York Cavalry's assignments during this phase of duty included: Louisa Court House (May 2), Ashland and Hanover Station (May 3), Glen Allen (May 4), Aylett's (May 5), King and Queen Court House and Centreville (May 6), and Morrisville (May 10). The summer of 1863 saw them involved at: Falmouth (June 1), Brandy Station (June 3), Beverly Ford and Brandy Station (June 9), Aldie (June 17), Middleburg (June 19), Uppervllle (June 21), and Rockville, Maryland (June 28). Engaged in Dix's Peninsula Campaign from June 24 to July 7, they were involved in operations at Cooksville June 29 before heading north to Pennsylvania, where they fought in the Battle of Gettysburg from July 1 to 3.

Afterward, they moved on to Monterey Gap (July 4), Smithburg and Emmettsburg (July 5), Hagerstown and Williamsport (July 6), Boonsborough (July 8), Funkstown (July 9), Jones' Cross Roads (July 10–13), and back to Hagerstown (July 11–13) and Williamsport (July 14) before heading to Falling Waters July 14. Remaining there until July 16, they moved on to Berryville, Virginia, and remained in that vicinity until they were ordered to Bristerburg July 27 and Fairfax August 3. Continuing their movements through Virginia, they were stationed at: Thoroughfare Gap (August 5), near Aldie (August 12–14), and at U. S. Ford (August 22) before heading out on the Union's expedition to Port Conway from September 1 to 3, and engaging in the advance from the Rappahannook to the Rapidan from September 13 to 17. Ordered to Culpeper on September 19, they moved on to Madison Court House (September 21) and White's Ford and Liberty Mills (September 21–22) before being assigned to scout duties along the Hazel River (September 27–28) and Hazel Run (October 2). Engaged in the Bristoe Campaign from October 9 to 22, their regiment's movements took them to: James City, Robertson's River and Bethesda Church (October 10), Culpeper (October 11), Brandy Station (October 11–12), Gainesville (October 14), Groveton (October 17–18), Haymarket, Buckland's Mills and New Baltimore (October 19), and Catlett's Station (November 4). Advancing again toward the Rappahannock from November 7 to 8, they moved through Stevensburg (November 7), Hartwood Church (November 15), and Germania Ford (November 18) before engaging in the Mine Run Campaign from November 26 to December 2. Ordered to Raccoon Ford December 5, they then moved on to Somerville December 18.

During the pivotal year of 1864, Campbell and his regiment continued to shift their positions, moving to Kelly's Ford on January 12, Ellis Ford (January 17), and Stevensburg and Ely's Ford (January 19) before participating in Kilpatrick's Raid to Richmond from February 28 to March 3. Ordered to Carrollton's Store on March 11, they then engaged in the Rapidan Campaign from May to June, operating at Craig's Meeting House and Todd's Tavern (May 5–6), the Wilderness (May 6–7) and Alsop's Farm, Spottsylvania (May 8). Engaged in Sheridan's Raid to the James River from May 9 to 24, they operated at North Anna River (May 9–10), Ground Squirrel Church and Yellow Tavern (May 11), Strawberry Hill (May 12), Polecat Station (May 23), Little River (May 26), Totopotomoy (May 28–31), the Hanover Court House (May 29–30), and Mechump's Creek (May 31). They were then engaged in the intense fighting and operations near Cold Harbor from June 1 to 12 before moving on to Malvern Hill (June 14) and Smith's Store near St. Mary's Church (June 15). Engaged in Wilson's Raid to the south and along the Danville Railroad from June 22 to 30, they ended this phase of service at Ream's Station July 3.

Having been transferred with his regiment to the command of Union Major-General Philip H. Sheridan in early August 1864, he and his regiment then participated in the Union's tide-turning Shenandoah Valley Campaign. Their first actions under this new command were undertaken near Winchester (August 17), Summit Point, Charlestown (August 21), and Kearneysville (August 25). On August 29, 1864, the 2nd New York Volunteer Cavalry was downsized into four companies (A through D), and Campbell was reassigned to his regiment's newly reconstituted C Company.

Campbell and his comrades were next engaged in chasing Confederate troops through: Waynesboro (September 2), Berryville (September 4), Winchester (September 9), and Abram's Creek (September 13) before fighting in the Battle of Opequon/Third Winchester (September 19). Continuing to pursue the enemy, they moved on to Cedarville (September 20) before fighting at Fisher's Hill and Front Royal Pike (September 21). Moving on to Milford September 22, they headed for Staunton (September 26), Waynesboro (September 29), Mt. Crawford (September 30), Bridgewater and Woodstock (October 2), Brock's Gap (October 6), New Market (October 7), Fisher's Hill (October 8), Tom's Brook (October 8–9), and Cedar Run (October 13). On October 19, they fought in the Battle of Cedar Creek. They then moved on to Nineveh (November 12), Mt. Jackson (November 22), and Hood's Hill (November 23) before embarking on the Union's expeditions from Kernstown to Moorefield (November 28 to December 2) and Lacy Springs (December 19 to 22).

But it was during Sheridan's Raid from Winchester, which took place from February 27 through March 25, 1865, that Campbell was assigned to the scouting and spy duties which would ultimately earn him his Medal of Honor, according to Mark Roth, the former assistant managing editor of Pittsburgh's Post-Gazette:

With nothing on but their dripping undershirts, [Archibald] Rowand and Campbell [had ridden 145 miles and hiked 11], until they encountered a detachment of Union troops near Harrison's Landing on the James River [where they had been ordered to proceed in order to deliver critical intelligence information to General Ulysses S. Grant]....Tucked inside Campbell's cheek, wrapped inside a ball of foil, was a strip of tissue paper with important tactical information from Sheridan.... As Grant and his party sat down for a late supper at City Point, Va., on that Sunday evening, a waiter came into the mess room and told Grant that a man was outside who wanted to see him and him only.... After Porter took Campbell's message to Grant, the general began to question him.... [Afterward], they gratefully accepted clean clothing and real beds. The next day, they were given fresh horses and uniforms, and set out to meet up with Sheridan at White House, Va.

According to later newspaper accounts of his life, Campbell "[was] said to have furnished the general with information which led to the winning of the battle at Winchester."

Following the surrender of the Confederate States Army to the Union Army at Appomattox in April 1865, the members of the 2nd New York Cavalry finally began to muster out and return home to their families and friends in New York. Companies E, F, G, H, I and K departed first after mustering out on June 5. Campbell then joined the remainder of his regiment in mustering out at Alexandria, Virginia on June 23.

== Post-war life ==
Following his honorable discharge from Civil War military service, Campbell wed Martha Spence (1856–1943). Their children, Philip S. (1882–1914), Helen Spence (1884–1936), and Minnie (1886–1930), were born in New York in 1882, on July 15, 1884, and in 1886, respectively. Their daughters, Alma W. (1890–1980), and Blanch I. (1892–1987), were born in Montana, respectively on August 31, 1890 and October 31, 1892, while Campbell was stationed at Fort Custer in Custer County as a private with Company 7 of the New York National Guard's 13th Infantry.

Campbell continued to serve with the U.S. military. According to General Horace Porter, in his book Campaigning with Grant, Campbell "remained a scout and [was] still in the employ of the government at that capacity at Fort Custer" during the year when Porter's book was published (1906). Ultimately, Campbell was rewarded for his service to the nation with commissions to the ranks of captain and assistant quartermaster with the U.S. Volunteers.

Following his death at Fort Snelling, Minnesota on May 6, 1904, Campbell was laid to rest with full military honors at the Arlington National Cemetery in Virginia.

His widow and children then returned to New York in mid-June 1904, and resettled in Brooklyn. Following her death on August 7, 1943, his widow, Martha, was then laid to rest beside him at Arlington, as were his daughters, Alma and Blanche, when they died, respectively, in 1980 and 1987.

== Medal of Honor citation ==
While his command was retreating before superior numbers at Woodstock, Virginia, he voluntarily rushed back with one companion and rescued his commanding officer, who had been unhorsed and left behind. At Amelia Courthouse captured 2 battle flags.

== See also ==
- Archibald H. Rowand, Jr.
- List of American Civil War Medal of Honor recipients: A–F
