= James Campbell and Sons =

Australian building materials manufacturer

James Campbell and Sons was a family business which manufactured and sold building materials in Brisbane, Queensland, Australia. As timbergetters and sawmillers, they pioneered new areas in Queensland. It was established by James Campbell and one of the sons was John Dunmore Campbell, a Member of the Queensland Legislative Assembly.
