= Senator Caldwell =

Senator Caldwell may refer to:

- Alexander Caldwell (1830–1917), U.S. Senator from Kansas from 1871 to 1873
- Alfred Caldwell (politician) (1817–1868), Virginia State Senate
- Alfred Caldwell Jr. (1847–1925), West Virginia State Senate
- Ben F. Caldwell (1848–1924), Illinois State Senate
- Greene Washington Caldwell (1806–1864), North Carolina State Senate
- James Caldwell (Missouri speaker) (1763–1840), Missouri State Senate
- James Caldwell (Ohio politician) (1770–1838), Ohio State Senate
- Jim Caldwell (Arkansas politician) (born 1936), Arkansas State Senate
- John Lawrence Caldwell (1875–1922), Kansas State Senate
- John Caldwell (Kentucky politician) (1757–1804), Kentucky State Senate
- Patrick C. Caldwell (1801–1855), South Carolina State Senate
- Robert Porter Caldwell (1821–1885), Tennessee State Senate
- Robert Caldwell (Wisconsin politician) (1866–1950), Wisconsin State Senate
- Ron Caldwell (born 1951), Arkansas State Senate
- Tod Robinson Caldwell (1818–1874), North Carolina State Senate
- William Parker Caldwell (1832–1903), Tennessee State Senate
