= Army of West Virginia =

- Active: August 9, 1864 – December 19, 1864
- Country: United States of America
- Branch: United States Army
- Type: Field Army
- Engagements: American Civil War

Commanders
- Notable commanders: Brig. Gen. George Crook; Col. Thomas Harris; Brig. Gen. Isaac Duval; Col. Joseph Thoburn; Col. J. Howard Kitching; Col. Rutherford B. Hayes; Brev. Maj. William McKinley

The Army of West Virginia served in the Union Army during the American Civil War and was the primary field army of the Department of West Virginia. It campaigned primarily in West Virginia, Southwest Virginia and in the Shenandoah Valley. It is noted for having two future U.S. presidents serve in its ranks: Rutherford B. Hayes and William McKinley, both from the 23rd Ohio Infantry. With fighting in the Valley ended, the Army of West Virginia's designation was discontinued.

== History ==
Brigadier General George Crook was appointed to command the Department of West Virginia on July 25, 1864. At the time, Crook's field army was named Army of the Kanawha. On August 9, 1864, the field army of the Department of West Virginia was given the title "Army of West Virginia". This "army" would eventually consist of three divisions and for all practical purposes functioned as a corps in Maj. Gen. Philip Sheridan's Army of the Shenandoah. This command has often been referred to as the VIII Corps. It should not be confused with the official Union VIII Corps, which was commanded by Maj. Gen. Lew Wallace and on guard duty along the B & O Railroad during this time. Crook led the army through the Shenandoah Valley Campaign and fought in all the major engagements.

The 1st Division was led by Col. Joseph Thoburn until he was killed in action at Cedar Creek. He was succeeded by Col. Thomas M. Harris. The 2nd "Kanawha" Division was led by Col. Isaac H. Duval until he was wounded at Third Winchester. Command of the division passed to Col. Rutherford B. Hayes who led the division at Cedar Creek. A Provisional Division led by Colonel J. Howard Kitching joined just prior to the battle of Cedar Creek. Exact composition of the Provisional Division is unknown other than approximately 1,000 soldiers including the 6th New York Heavy Artillery. Kitching was severely wounded at Cedar Creek and died the following year as a result. His place was taken by Col. Wilhelm Heine.

On December 19, 1864, with the fighting in the Valley over, the official designation as "Army of West Virginia" was discontinued but Crook retained command of the Department of West Virginia. Hayes' division remained in the Department of West Virginia while Thoburn's (Harris') and Kitching's (Heine's) divisions were transferred to the Army of the James.

== Commander ==
- Major General Franz Sigel
- Major General David Hunter (21 May–8 Aug 1864)
- Major General George Crook (8 Aug–19 Dec 1864)

== Major battles ==
- Battle of Cloyd's Mountain
- Battle of New Market
- Battle of Piedmont
- Battle of Lynchburg
- Battle of Cool Spring
- Battle of Rutherford's Farm
- Second Battle of Kernstown
- Battle of Berryville
- Battle of Opequon
- Battle of Fisher's Hill
- Battle of Cedar Creek
