= Thomas Maley Harris =

American general and physician

- Gen. Thomas Maley Harris, M.D.
- Born: June 17, 1817; Harrisville, Virginia (now West Virginia)
- Died: September 30, 1906 (aged 89); Harrisville, West Virginia
- Burial place: Harrisville I.O.O.F. Cemetery, Harrisville, West Virginia
- Military career
- Allegiance: United States of America; Union
- Branch: United States Army; Union Army
- Service years: 1861 - 1866
- Rank: Brigadier General; Brevet Major General
- Commands: 10th West Virginia Volunteer Infantry Regiment; Department of West Virginia (Division)
- Conflicts: American Civil War; Battle of Droop Mountain; Second Battle of Kernstown; Battle of Opequon; Battle of Cedar Creek; Battle of Hatcher's Run; Third Battle of Petersburg; Battle of Appomattox Court House
- Other work: Physician, State Legislator, Author Lincoln Conspirators' Trial and Execution

Thomas Maley Harris (1817–1906) was an American physician and officer. He served as a Union general during the American Civil War.

Born and raised in Harrisville, Virginia (now part of West Virginia), Harris originally set out to be a teacher, but changed career paths to study medicine. He received his medical degree from Louisville Medical College in 1843 and returned to Virginia to practice medicine until 1861, when he closed his practice when the Civil War began.

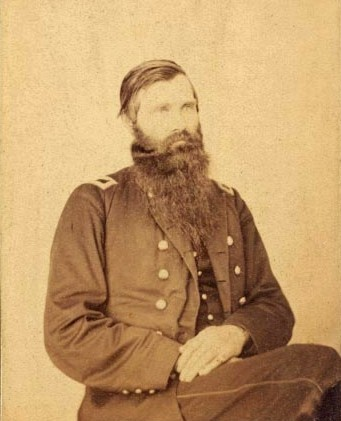

During the war, Harris commanded the 10th West Virginia Volunteer Infantry Regiment in the Shenandoah Valley, then a brigade and division during Philip Sheridan's Valley Campaigns of 1864. He was brevetted to brigadier general for service at the Battle of Cedar Creek on October 19, 1864.

He was transferred to the Army of the James and took command of a division of reinforcements from the Department of West Virginia attached to the XXIV Corps. He received a full promotion to brigadier general in March 1865 and a brevet promotion to major general for service at the battle of Fort Gregg on April 2, 1865. His troops were among those directly responsible for cutting off Robert E. Lee's line of retreat at Appomattox Courthouse. Following the Confederate surrender at Appomattox, Harris served on the military commission which tried the Lincoln Conspirators. Following the trial general Harris authored two books about the trial evidences and proceedings: Assassination of Lincoln: A History of the Great Conspiracy, Trial of the Conspirators by a Military Commission, and a Review of the Trial of John H. Surratt, 1892; and later: Rome's Responsibility for the Assassination of Abraham Lincoln, 1897.

After the war, Harris served in the West Virginia House of Delegates in 1867. He was a member of the Whig Party and then joined the Republican Party when the Civil War started in 1861. Harris also served as mayor of Harrisville, West Virginia. He served as an adjunct general in the state militia, from 1867 to 1869, and as the U.S. pension agent for Wheeling, West Virginia from 1871 to 1876. He resumed his medical practice until his retirement in 1885.

== External sources ==
- Eicher, John H., and Eicher, David J., Civil War High Commands, Stanford University Press, 2001, ISBN 0-8047-3641-3.
