= Aquilla B. Caldwell =

American judge

Honorable Aquilla B. Caldwell

1st Attorney General of West Virginia
- In office June 20, 1863 – December 31, 1864
- Governor: Arthur I. Boreman
- Preceded by: Office established
- Succeeded by: Ephraim B. Hall

5th Attorney General of West Virginia
- In office July 2, 1869 – December 31, 1870
- Governor: William E. Stevenson
- Preceded by: Thayer Melvin
- Succeeded by: Joseph Sprigg

Personal details
- Born: February 11, 1814 Caldwells Run, Ohio County, Virginia (present-day West Virginia), U.S.
- Died: June 18, 1893 (aged 79) Wheeling, West Virginia, U.S.
- Party: Republican
- Parent(s): Joseph Caldwell; Mary Yarnell Caldwell
- Profession: lawyer and politician

Aquilla Bolton Caldwell (February 11, 1814 – June 18, 1893) was an American lawyer who served as the first and fifth Attorney General of West Virginia, serving between 1863–1864 and 1869–1870.

== Early and family life ==
Caldwell was born on Caldwells Run in Ohio County near Wheeling to Mary Yarnell Caldwell and her husband Joseph Caldwell. His grandfather, James Caldwell, emigrated from northern Ireland with his family and in 1770 settled in the near-wilderness that became Ohio County. With Ebenezer Zane, he helped found the town of Wheeling on the Ohio River, becoming a justice of the peace in 1777 and militia commander during the American Revolutionary War, as well as raising a large family. His sons (Bolton's uncles) James Caldwell (Ohio politician) and Alexander Caldwell (Virginia judge) helped found the state of Ohio (and became the first U.S. Congressman for the district across the river from Wheeling) and U.S. District Judge for the Western District of Virginia, respectively.

His father Joseph, the youngest son of James Caldwell Sr., after military service during the War of 1812 became the first president of Wheeling's Merchants and Merchants Bank. He remarried after Mary died when young Bolton was five.

After private education locally, Bolton attended Jefferson College (now Washington & Jefferson College) and received a degree in 1833, shortly before his cousin Alfred Caldwell (politician) (son of James Caldwell Jr.). Bolton Caldwell then went to Harvard University and studied law under Joseph Story and Greenleaf, as his cousin Alfred would soon also emulate.

On May 14, 1846, A. Bolton Caldwell married Mathilda Anne Newman, with whom he would have two children.

== Career ==
After graduation, Bolton Caldwell sought his fortune by practicing law in Mississippi beginning in 1840. He moved to Louisiana in 1844, won elections in 1845, 1847 and 1852 and became the parish attorney (prosecutor) for East Carroll Parish, Louisiana. Caldwell then returned home and joined the Virginia bar. In 1858 he returned to Wheeling (where his cousin Alfred had begun his own legal practice and already twice been elected mayor and once to the Virginia Senate), and began his legal practice, which included stints as a federal prosecutor and as the Ohio County prosecutor as discussed below.

A. Bolton Caldwell became the United States Attorney for the Western District of Virginia after nomination by President Abraham Lincoln and the concurrence of the U.S. Senate, serving from 1861 until 1863. His cousin Alfred Caldwell, meanwhile, as a reward for his active support of President Lincoln and the Republican Party, was appointed consul to the Kingdom of Hawaii in 1861 (and with the Senate's approval served until 1867, when he was removed for malfeasance by President Johnson).

Meanwhile, in 1863 West Virginians elected Bolton Caldwell as their first Attorney General. He served for 18 months, completing his term. During President Lincoln's first term in office, Caldwell was offered an appointment as Judge to the United States District Court, but for personal reasons, he turned down the appointment, John Curtiss Underwood being selected instead.

On July 1, 1869, Caldwell returned to the Office of the West Virginia Attorney General when he was appointed by the Governor after Attorney General Thayer Melvin resigned. After his term as Attorney General Bolton Caldwell won election as Ohio County Prosecutor and later Circuit Judge.

== Death and legacy ==
Caldwell died in 1893 at the home of his son-in-law in Wheeling. His cousin Alfred Caldwell Jr. (his cousin and ally Alfred Caldwell's son) would become West Virginia's 10th attorney general, first winning election as a Democrat in 1885.

== Sources ==
- The Political Graveyard
- http://www.wvago.gov
- WV Blue Book

Legal offices
Preceded by new office	Attorney General of West Virginia; 1863–1864	Succeeded by Ephraim B. Hall
