= Samuel Herrick (politician) =

American politician (1779–1852)

Member of the U.S. House of Representatives from Ohio's 4th district
- In office March 4, 1817 – March 3, 1821
- Preceded by: James Caldwell
- Succeeded by: David Chambers

Personal details
- Born: April 14, 1779 Amenia, New York
- Died: June 4, 1852 (aged 73) Zanesville, Ohio
- Resting place: Greenwood Cemetery
- Party: Democratic-Republican; Jacksonian

Samuel Herrick (April 14, 1779 – June 4, 1852) was a United States representative from Ohio.

Born in Amenia, New York, Herrick pursued an academic course. He studied law in Carlisle, Pennsylvania, was admitted to the bar in 1805 and commenced practice in St. Clairsville, Ohio. He moved to Zanesville, Ohio, in 1810. He was appointed prosecuting attorney of Guernsey County in 1810 and also United States district attorney. In 1814 he was appointed prosecuting attorney of Licking County and commissioned brigadier general of the Ohio Militia.

Herrick was elected as a Democratic-Republican to the Fifteenth Congress and reelected to the Sixteenth Congress (March 4, 1817 – March 3, 1821). He served as chairman of the Committee on Private Land Claims (Fifteenth Congress).

Herrick was not a candidate for reelection in 1820. He continued the practice of law. He served as presidential elector on the Jackson and Calhoun ticket in 1828. He was appointed United States district attorney for Ohio in 1829 but resigned June 30, 1830. He died in Zanesville, June 4, 1852, and was interred in City (now Greenwood) Cemetery.

== Sources ==
- United States Congress. "Samuel Herrick (id: H000542)". Biographical Directory of the United States Congress.

U.S. House of Representatives
Preceded by James Caldwell	United States Representative from Ohio's 4th congressional district 1817-03-04 – 1821-03-03	Succeeded by David Chambers
Legal offices
Preceded by William Creighton, Jr.	U.S. Attorney for the District of Ohio^{1} 1810–1818	Succeeded by John C. Wright
Preceded by Joseph S. Benham	U.S. Attorney for the District of Ohio^{1} 1829–1830-06-30	Succeeded by Noah Haynes Swayne
Notes and references
1. DAG000001419
