= Ephraim B. Hall =

American lawyer

Honorable Ephraim B. Hall

2nd Attorney General of West Virginia
- In office January 1, 1865 – December 31, 1865
- Governor: Arthur I. Boreman
- Preceded by: Aquilla B. Caldwell
- Succeeded by: Edwin Maxwell

Personal details
- Born: August 25, 1822 Middletown, Virginia (present-day Fairmont, West Virginia), U.S.
- Died: January 15, 1898 (aged 75) Santa Barbara, California, U.S.
- Resting place: Santa Barbara Cemetery, Santa Barbara, California, U.S.
- Party: Republican
- Profession: lawyer, politician, and judge

Ephraim Benoni Hall (August 25, 1822 – January 15, 1898) was the second West Virginia Attorney General.

Hall was born on August 25, 1822, in Middletown (now Fairmont) in what is now Marion County (then in Virginia, but later in West Virginia). He read law and was admitted to the bar in 1851 subsequently practiced law in his home county and neighboring counties. In 1861, Ephraim was elected to the Virginia convention in Richmond. On April 17, the convention voted to adopt an ordinance of secession from the Union; Ephraim was one of 58 to voted against secession. When the convention recessed in May 1861, Hall returned to Marion County to survey the people and determined that the majority were Unionist.

Hall did not return to Richmond in June and risked charges of treason for doing so. Later in 1861, Hall attended the Wheeling Convention, which re-organized a state government loyal to the United States—the future state of West Virginia. Hall attended the constitutional convention that produced the first West Virginia Constitution, and was one of four delegates to the convention selected to present the document to Congress.

Hall was elected to a two-year term as West Virginia Attorney General for the term beginning January 1, 1865. In October 1865, Hall was elected judge of the Tenth Circuit and resigned as Attorney General in December. He was re-elected a circuit judge of the Sixth Circuit (formerly the Tenth) but declined to accept.

In March 1870, Governor William E. Stevenson appointed Hall to be a member of the commission to negotiate the debt between Virginia and West Virginia. In September 1870, Hall was appointed to fill a vacancy as circuit judge in the Sixth Circuit. In October 1872, he resigned as Judge and moved to California. In 1875, he resumed the practice of law. Hall was an attorney in Santa Barbara until his death.

Legal offices
| Preceded by Aquilla B. Caldwell | Attorney General of West Virginia; 1865 | Succeeded by Edwin Maxwell |
