= Alfred Caldwell Jr. =

American lawyer and politician (1847–1925)

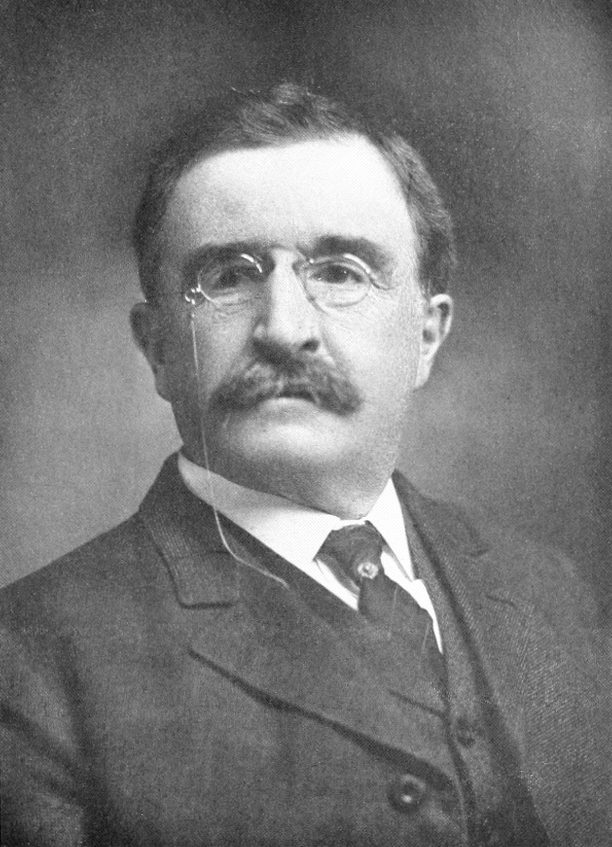

10th Attorney General of West Virginia
- In office March 1, 1885 – March 1, 1893
- Governor: Emanuel Willis Wilson
- Preceded by: Cornelius Clarkson Watts
- Succeeded by: Thomas S. Riley

Personal details
- Born: July 14, 1847 Wheeling, Virginia, US
- Died: March 11, 1925 (aged 77) Wheeling, West Virginia, US
- Resting place: Greenwood Cemetery
- Party: Democratic
- Spouse: Laura E. Goshorn
- Children: William Caldwell and six daughters
- Education: Yale University
- Profession: Politician, attorney

Alfred Caldwell Jr. (July 14, 1847 – March 11, 1925), was an American lawyer and politician. He was the 10th attorney general of West Virginia, as well as at various times on the Wheeling city council and for two years as his home town's solicitor.

== Early and family life ==
Alfred Caldwell was born on July 14, 1847, to lawyer Alfred Caldwell and his wife. His family was a leading political family in the Ohio River Valley region, as his great-grandfather James Caldwell had settled in 1772 near what he helped establish as the town of Wheeling, and his father was mayor of what became a city and a manufacturing center in his lifetime. Relatives who died shortly before his birth included Alexander Caldwell who had been the U.S. district judge for the Western District of Virginia and James Caldwell Jr. who had helped to establish the state of Ohio and had been the first U.S.congressman from the district across the Ohio River from Wheeling.

Neither his father (who was elected to a part-time position representing Wheeling in the Virginia Senate beginning in 1857) nor his lawyer cousin Aquilla B. Caldwell owned slaves by 1860, and both supported the newly formed Republican party and President Abraham Lincoln elected that year. When Virginia voted to secede from the Union in April 1861, most Ohio County voters disagreed, and both lawyer Caldwells worked to keep their area in the union, which ultimately led to the creation of the state of West Virginia in 1862. Meanwhile, young Alfred was studying at West Liberty Academy, and when his father was appointed consul to the Kingdom of Hawaii, he went with his family. There, rather than fight in the American Civil War, he attended the College of Oahu with the children of missionaries. He returned to the United States in 1864 to attend Yale University and received a bachelor's degree in philosophy in 1867.

He married Laura E. Goshorn of Wheeling and they remained married for 55 years until his death. Two of their children died, but their son, William Goshorn Caldwell (1872–1949), and five daughters including Laura B. Caldwell Mead (1875–1963) and Martha Caldwell survived him.

== Career ==
In early 1867, his father returned to Wheeling, having been removed from office by President Andrew Johnson because of irregularities in the accounts and accusations that his son-in-law had been enriching himself. Alfred Jr. studied law under his father's guidance and was admitted to the West Virginia bar in 1868, the year of his father's death and when his uncle, Aquilla Bolton Caldwell (who had been elected as the new state's first attorney general), was appointed West Virginia's 5th attorney general.

Alfred Caldwell Jr. also continued his family's political tradition, beginning as clerk to Wheeling's city council in 1869, and ultimately serving many terms on the council, as well as two years as city solicitor. In 1875, he resigned after winning election to the West Virginia Senate, but as a Democrat.

In 1884, voters from across West Virginia elected Caldwell attorney general. He was re-elected four years later, holding office from March 4, 1885, until March 3, 1893. His successor was another Wheeling attorney, Thomas S. Riley.

== Death and legacy ==
Caldwell died at home in 1925. Like his uncle, A. Bolton Caldwell, he is buried at Greenwood Cemetery in Wheeling.

Some of his papers are in the West Virginia state archives.

Legal offices
| Preceded by Cornelius Clarkson Watts | Attorney General of West Virginia; 1885–1893 | Succeeded by Thomas S. Riley |
