= Mt. Woods Cemetery =

Jewish cemetery in West Virginia, USA

- U.S. National Register of Historic Places
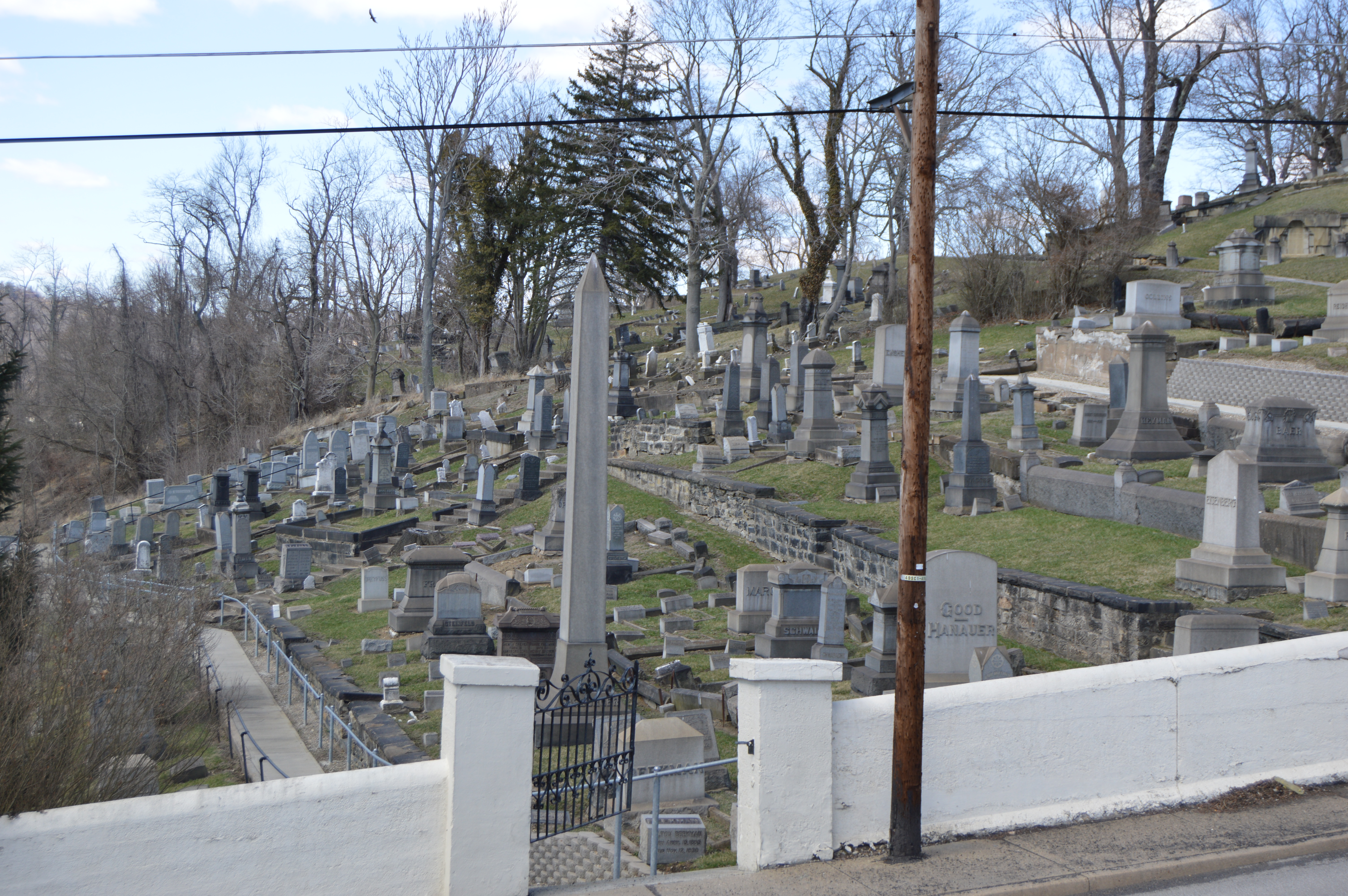
- Graves in the southeastern sections

- Location within West Virginia Location within the United States
- Location: Mt. Wood Road, N. of 4th, Wheeling, West Virginia
- Coordinates: 40°04′55″N 80°43′21″W
- Area: 12.49 acres (5.05 ha)
- Built: 1831, 1848, 1865
- Architectural style: Late Victorian, Neoclassical
- NRHP reference No.: 13000685
- Added to NRHP: September 4, 2013

Mt. Woods Cemetery, also known as Mt. Wood Cemetery, Hebrew and Jewish Orthodox Cemetery and Eoff Street Temple Cemetery, is a historic rural cemetery located at Wheeling, Ohio County, West Virginia. It was listed on the National Register of Historic Places in 2013.

== History ==
In 1831, the Woods family established a small one-acre cemetery was established on the hill overlooking North Wheeling then known as Wheeling Hill. According to local legend, Ebenezer Zane paused on the hill and declared the area he saw the "land of promise" for which he had been looking. Pioneer Robert T. Woods (1754–1831) (who had settled in the area with his brothers Archibald and Andrew) was the first interment. Within two decades Wheeling's other cemetery, the Hempfield cemetery (dedicated in 1816) was nearly full and in the path chosen by the Hempfield Railroad (chartered in 1850 and which by 1857 connected Wheeling and Washington, Pennsylvania on the other side of the Ohio River).

Thus prominent Wheeling citizens organized a cemetery company and developed this location. Originally situated on approximately 20 acres, above "Jonathan's Ravine" with scenic views of the Ohio River, Wheeling Creek and Wheeling Island. Its landscape was originally designed by Robert C. Woods (surveyor and son of Robert T. Woods), with individual plots laid out according to the landscape's contours. The cemetery became popular in the Victorian era for its views, as well as the preferred place of interment for a number of prominent citizens of Wheeling and surrounding Ohio County. The prime hilltop Section A contains obelisks commemorating Alfred Caldwell (1817–1868), Edward M. Norton, William P. Wilson, and the Luke family.

The cemetery also contains the graves of Congressman Thomas O. Edwards (1810–1876), Joseph Thoburn (1825–1864) and Daniel E. Frost (1819–1864), prominent in the West Virginia statehood movement and who died fighting for the Union in the American Civil War. Other historic burials include Dr. Simon Hullihen (1810–1857), perhaps the first oralmaxilliary surgeon in the U.S., and Dr. Eliza Hughes (West Virginia's first female doctor and the sister of Confederate sympathizer and Ohio County's Virginia Civil War state delegate Dr. Alfred Hughes).

The earliest gravestone contains an 1817 date. In addition to remains reinterred from the Hempfield cemetery, remains were relocated from the Chapline and East Wheeling cemeteries when those were closed by the late 1800s, although some plots lower down the hill laid out in this period were never sold and that area became wooded. The Jewish cemetery was established beginning in 1849, following the unexpected death of itinerant rabbi Mayer Mannheim, and being on a steep slope, had persistent issues which required retaining wall construction; its first plots were laid in 1865 and burials continued well into the 20th century. In 1866, Greenwood cemetery was established east of the city, which decreased funeral use of this cemetery, although it remained an important regional park. In 1933 as the Great Depression began, paths were improved and 100 oak trees planted. Mt. Woods cemetery shrank somewhat over time, as interments became less frequent. The original remains from the two List family mausoleums were later reinterred at Greenwood Cemetery. Many trees predate the 1930s, with shrubbery surrounding individual graves removed more recently for easier maintenance. After major vandalism in 1974, the cemetery company relinquished its responsibilities to the City of Wheeling in 1977. It now includes 11.5 acres in the Mt. Woods cemetery and 0.99 acres in the Jewish section (still owned and maintained by Temple Shalom).

== Architecture ==
Significant tombs, gravestones and buildings exemplify antebellum, Victorian-era, and early to mid-20th-century funerary art. Notable structures include the entrance gate (1920s), the Rosenberg Arch (1886) and ten family mausoleums, including the Forbes mausoleum (1889), Scott mausoleum (c. 1890), Cotts mausoleum (1863), Pracht mausoleum (1893), and Captain John List mausoleum (c. 1850s).
