= Battle of Berryville =

Battle of the American Civil War

Coordinates: 39°9′43.5″N 77°59′51.2″W

- Part of the American Civil War
Date	September 3–4, 1864
Location	Clarke County, Virginia
Result	Inconclusive

Belligerents
United States (Union)	(Confederate States of America) CSA (Confederacy)

Commanders and leaders
George Crook	Richard H. Anderson

Strength
2 Divisions	Division

Casualties and losses
314	295

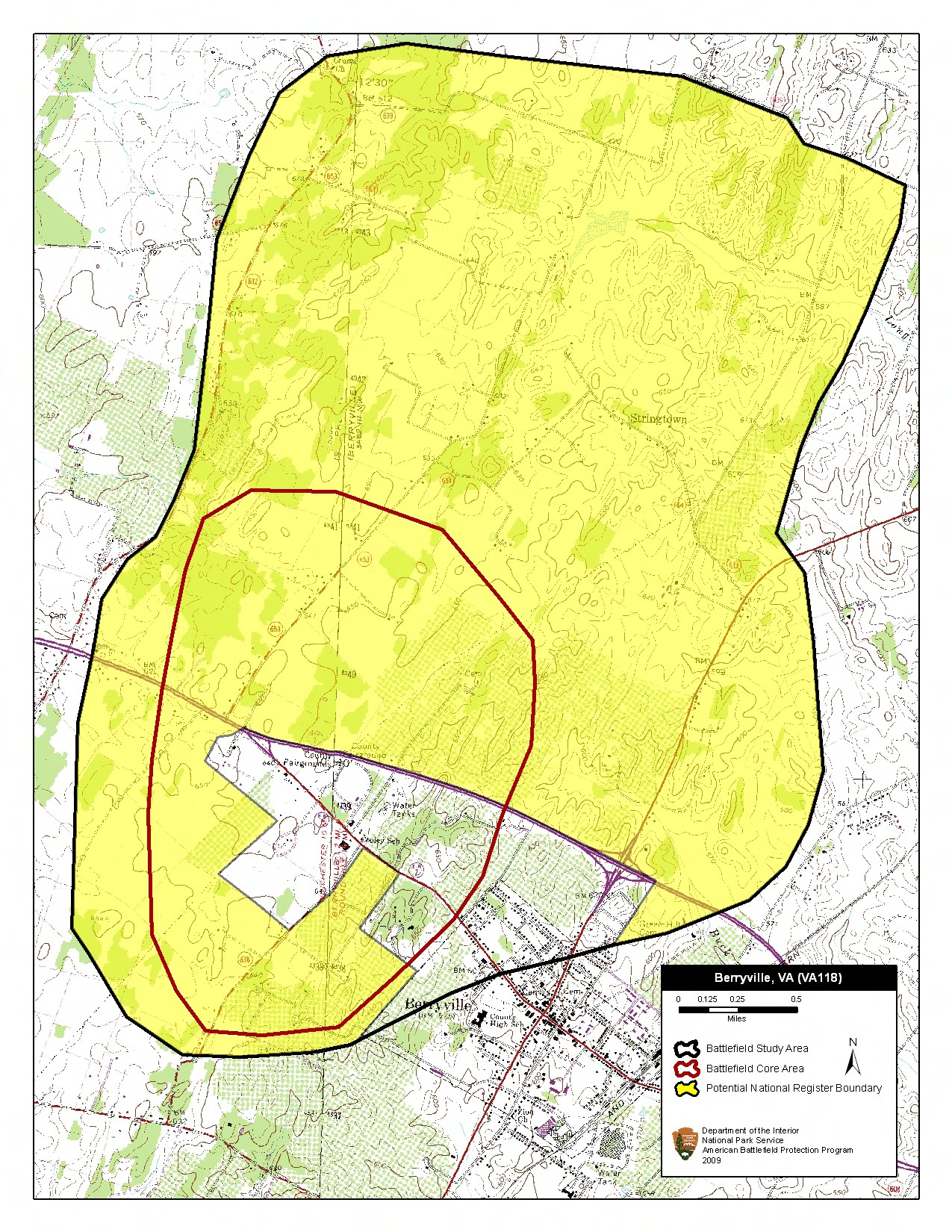
Map of Berryville Battlefield core and study areas by the American Battlefield Protection Program.

The Battle of Berryville was fought September 3 and September 4, 1864, in Clarke County, Virginia. It took place toward the end of the American Civil War.

After taking control of Smithfield Summit on August 29, Union Maj. Gen. Philip H. Sheridan marched to Berryville with his 50,000 man Army of the Shenandoah. At the same time, Confederate Lt. Gen. Jubal A. Early sent Maj. Gen. Joseph B. Kershaw's division east from Winchester to Berryville. At about 5:00 p.m., Kershaw attacked Colonel Joseph Thoburn's division of the Army of West Virginia while they were preparing to go into camp. Kershaw routed Thoburn's left flank before the rest of the corps came to the rescue. Darkness ended the fighting, with both sides bringing in heavy reinforcements. The next morning, Early, seeing the strength of the Union's entrenched line, retreated behind Opequon Creek.
