= Alfred Caldwell (politician) =

American politician (1817–1868)

Member of the Virginia Senate from the Ohio, Hancock, Brooke district
- In office December 7, 1857 – April 4, 1861
- Preceded by: Lewis Steenrod
- Succeeded by: n/a

Personal details
- Born: June 4, 1817 St. Clairsville, Ohio, U.S.
- Died: May 3, 1868 (aged 50) Wheeling, West Virginia, U.S.
- Resting place: Mt. Woods Cemetery
- Party: Republican
- Spouse(s): Martha Baird; Alice Wheat Lennon
- Children: Alfred Jr. and others
- Profession: lawyer, politician

Alfred Caldwell (June 4, 1817 – May 3, 1868) was a Virginia lawyer, politician and prominent abolitionist in what became Wheeling, West Virginia during the American Civil War. Before the war, he was twice elected Wheeling's mayor, and served in the Virginia Senate. A prominent early Republican and supporter of President Abraham Lincoln, he became consul to the Kingdom of Hawaii in August 1861. However, Caldwell was removed from office in 1867 after substantiation of corruption allegations, and he died shortly after returning to Wheeling.

== Early and family life ==
Born in St. Clairsville, Ohio in 1817 to banker and U.S. Congressman James Caldwell Jr. (1770 - 1838) and his wife Anne Booker Caldwell, Alfred Caldwell attended Washington College, in Washington, Pennsylvania and graduated (after a break unlike his cousin A. Bolton Caldwell) with an A. B. degree in 1836. He then attended Harvard Law School and received his J.D. in 1838, shortly after A. Bolton Caldwell who would later become an ally in Wheeling.

His paternal grandfather James Caldwell Sr. (1724-1804) had helped Ebenezer Zane found Wheeling in what was then Virginia and become an early Justice of the Peace, as well as commanded a local militia unit during the American Revolutionary War and raised a large family. The senior James Caldwell's brothers had also settled in developing areas—John in the Shenandoah Valley and David in North Carolina (where he became the grandfather of John C. Calhoun).

Alfred Caldwell married twice. On August 7, 1839 he married Martha Baird (1822–1859) of Washington, Pennsylvania, who was the granddaughter of Patriot physician Dr. Absalom Baird of Chester County, Pennsylvania. They had nine children including George B. Caldwell (b. 1840, who became executor of his father's estate), Anna Caldwell (b. 1842), Jane W. (Jeannie) Caldwell (b. 1844), Alfred Caldwell Jr. (1847-1925), Alexander Caldwell (b. 1849, died before 1860), Harry Caldwell (1851 - 1942), Kate Caldwell (b. 1853), Ellen Caldwell (b. 1855) and Martha Caldwell (b. 1858). After her death, he married Alice Wheat Lennon on August 15, 1860, with whom he had five children.

== Career ==
Alfred Caldwell was admitted to the Virginia Bar and shortly after his father died, established his practice in Wheeling, which his grandfather James Caldwell Sr. had helped establish, and which had become an important crossing of the Ohio River on the National Road slightly east of St. Clairsville. His uncle Alexander Caldwell was the U.S. District Judge for the Western District of Virginia, which included Wheeling.

Wheeling's voters elected Caldwell mayor in 1849 over the incumbent Sobieski Brady the following year and again in 1857 when he defeated George T. Tingle, long-time secretary of the Wheeling Gas Company. Thus, Caldwell served from January 1850-January 1852 and January 1856-January 1858. In 1856 he ran as an independent against Democrat Col. Jones of Brooke county, and won election to the Virginia state senate, a part-time position he held until the beginning of the American Civil War.

Caldwell was a prominent Republican, helping establish the party in Wheeling. He owned at least one slave in 1850, but none by 1860. He attended the Republican National Convention in 1860 and supported the nomination of Abraham Lincoln as President.

After Lincoln's election and with approval of the U.S. Senate, Caldwell became consul to the Kingdom of Hawaii effective in August 1861, which also avoided trouble because of his abolitionist and Union sympathies although it limited his involvement in the formation of the new state of West Virginia. In the days of steamship travel, this was in important port for ships traveling to Asia, and Caldwell later related with pride how he refused British naval vessels use of the stored American coal, but allowed friendly Russian naval vessels access to those crucial supplies. However, Caldwell was removed from that office in 1867 after allegations that he and a son were using the office to enrich themselves, and an audit found the finances in arrears.

== Death and legacy ==
Alfred Caldwell died in Wheeling on May 3, 1868. He was interred at Mt. Woods Cemetery in Wheeling, which he had helped organize.

His cousin Aquilla B. Caldwell would continue the family's political tradition after accepting appointment as West Virginia's 5th attorney general in 1869 and later winning election as Ohio county prosecutor and then circuit judge. Alfred Caldwell's son Alfred Caldwell Jr. also continued that tradition by winning election to the West Virginia state senate (but unlike his father and cousin, as a Democrat) in 1875 and later twice won election as West Virginia's attorney general, beginning in 1884.
