= Joseph Thoburn =

American physician

- Born: 29 April 1825; Mallusk, County Antrim, Ireland
- Died: 19 October 1864 (aged 39); Frederick County, Virginia
- Burial place: Mt. Wood Cemetery, Wheeling, West Virginia
- Military career
- Allegiance: United States of America; Union
- Branch: United States Army; Union Army
- Service years: 1861–1864
- Rank: Colonel
- Commands: 1st Division of the VIII Corps
- Conflicts: American Civil War: Battle of Philippi; Valley Campaign; First Battle of Kernstown; Battle of Port Republic; Valley Campaigns of 1864; Second Battle of Kernstown; Battle of Cool Spring; Battle of Berryville; Third Battle of Winchester; Battle of Cedar Creek †
- Other work: school teacher, physician

Joseph Thoburn (29 April 1825 – 19 October 1864) was an Irish-born American officer and brigade commander in the Union Army during the American Civil War. An accomplished physician and soldier from the state of West Virginia, he was killed in action in the Shenandoah Valley at the Battle of Cedar Creek.

== Early life and career ==
Joseph Thoburn was the son of Matthew and Jane Lyle (Crawford) Thoburn. He was born in 1825, in County Antrim in Ireland. That autumn, his father emigrated to Canada. In 1826, the family moved south to the United States and settled on a farm near St. Clairsville, Ohio, in rural Belmont County. He was educated at the local school, and developed a love for books at an early age. As a young man, he taught school for several years before becoming a medical student, studying under Dr. Ephraim Gaston, of Morristown, Ohio. He subsequently attended Starling Medical College in Columbus, Ohio. He relocated in 1849 to Brownsville, Pennsylvania, where he briefly partnered in a medical practice before resigning to accept an appointment in Columbus at the Ohio Lunatic Asylum as an assistant to the chief physician.

Because of political influences, he was displaced in 1853 and moved to Wheeling, Virginia (now West Virginia), where he formed a private medical practice that flourished in the late 1850s. He married Catherine "Kate" Ann Mitchell 13 December 1853, in Martins Ferry, Ohio. The couple had three children, a son and two daughters.

== Civil War service ==
After the bombardment of Fort Sumter in Charleston Harbor in April 1861, the following month Thoburn enlisted as the surgeon of the 1st Virginia Infantry, a three-months regiment under Colonel Benjamin F. Kelley. He accompanied his regiment in the Battle of Philippi, where his patients included a wounded Colonel Kelley.

In August 1861, the regiment was mustered out of service. Most of the men reenlisted in the reorganized 1st Virginia Infantry, a three-years regiment. With Kelley still out with his wound, Thoburn was commissioned as the colonel of the regiment. He led the command in numerous small battles and engagements in what became West Virginia and also in the Shenandoah Valley in 1862 and 1863. The following year, he assumed command of a division in the VIII Corps and fought in the Valley Campaigns of 1864 in the army of Philip Sheridan.

During the Battle of Opequon or Third Winchester, as the XIX Corps was reorganizing its lines, Thoburn's division came up from reserve and took position at the edge of a woods. Sheridan soon arrived and directed Thoburn to move forward as soon as the other division of the Eighth Corps was ready. About 3 p.m. "a mighty battle yell," from the other side of Red Bud Run announced the arrival of those troops. The Union lines advanced, and, as one participant recalled, "For thirty minutes the battle that ensued was perfectly terrific, but then the forces in our front gave way, and in an instant we were over their works, and after them with yells and shouts of victory."

== Death and legacy ==
On 19 October 1864, Joseph Thoburn was killed in action during the Battle of Cedar Creek, a Union victory. His corps commander, Maj. Gen. George Crook, reported, "I am pained to report the death of Col. Joseph Thoburn, commanding First Division, and Captain Philip G. Bier, assistant adjutant-general on my staff. Both fell mortally wounded while rallying the men. Brave, efficient, and ever conspicuous for their gallantry on the field of battle, in them the country sustained a loss not easily repaired."

A biographer later wrote, "Dr. Thoburn was greatly beloved by his brother officers and men, as a man full of kindness and benevolence, and of undoubted bravery and patriotism. As a physician, he possessed very clever attainments, with a high sense of professional honor."

Thoburn's body was taken to Wheeling for a large public funeral. It was taken with a military escort to Mt. Wood Cemetery with a public procession including city officers, council, medical faculty, military escort and many citizens. His widow died in 1886 and was buried beside him.
