= James Caldwell (Ohio politician) =

American politician (1770–1838)

Member of the U.S. House of Representatives from Ohio's 4th district
- In office March 4, 1813 – March 3, 1817
- Preceded by: District Created
- Succeeded by: Samuel Herrick

Member of the Ohio Senate from Belmont County
- In office 1809–1813
- Preceded by: Josiah Dillon
- Succeeded by: Charles Hammond

Personal details
- Born: November 30, 1770 Baltimore, Province of Maryland, British America
- Died: May 5, 1838 (aged 67) Wheeling, Virginia, U.S. (now West Virginia)
- Resting place: Episcopal Cemetery, St. Clairsville, Ohio
- Party: Democratic-Republican

James Caldwell (November 30, 1770 – May 5, 1838) was the first member of the United States House of Representatives to represent Ohio's 4th congressional district.

== Early and family life ==
His father James Caldwell (1724-1804) and his wife Elizabeth were Irish gentry whose name reflected Castle Caldwell established in Ulster Plantation a century earlier. They had emigrated with nine children to Maryland in 1769 and then moved to what became Wheeling in what was then Virginia in 1772. During their sea voyage, Elizabeth Caldwell gave birth to Samuel Caldwell, and in Baltimore, Maryland she bore this James Caldwell Jr., then Susana Caldwell (b. 1772), Alexander Caldwell (1774-1838), and Joseph Caldwell (b. 1777). James Caldwell the elder became a Virginia justice of the peace and militia leader in the developing rural area, and his son/James's brother John Caldwell helped erect Fort Henry to defend the new settlement against Native American raiders.

== Career ==
In 1799, before his father's death, James Caldwell moved a few miles westward on the National Road to St. Clairsville, Ohio. He purchased the first lot in the village, and opened a store in 1801. He became wealthy and was the first president of the Belmont Bank of St. Clairsville. When Belmont County was organized in 1801, Northwest Territory Governor Arthur St. Clair named him Clerk of Courts.

He was a Belmont county delegate to the 1802 Ohio Constitutional Convention. He represented Belmont County in the Ohio Senate from 1809 to 1813.

Caldwell ran for his first term in Congress in 1812 as a captain in the militia supporting the administration and the War of 1812 against Federalist candidate Bezaleel Wells. All six seats in Ohio were won by Democratic-Republicans, but Caldwell was the only one who supported the Tammany wing of the party. He was elected to the 13th and 14th United States Congresses (March 4, 1813 to March 3, 1817).

After he retired from Congress, he resumed business in St. Clairsville.

He served as one of Ohio's Presidential electors in 1820 for James Monroe, and in 1824 for Henry Clay.

After his wife's death, Caldwell moved to Wheeling, which his father had helped establish, several brothers lived, and where his son Alfred Caldwell practiced law and was becoming a prominent politician. James Caldwell Jr. lived and ultimately died at Beemer's Tavern, essentially a residential hotel. During his final years, he was president of Wheeling's Merchants and Mechanics Bank, which later merged into the National Exchange Bank.

== Death and legacy ==
James Caldwell died in Wheeling on May 5, 1838. His brother Alexander, who had become the U.S. District Judge for the Western District of Virginia, died the following year. His son Alfred was twice elected mayor of Wheeling in the 1850s, despite being a prominent abolitionist, and saw the village become a city. Alfred Caldwell also served in the Virginia Senate, helped establish the state of West Virginia after the American Civil War, and served as U.S. Consul to the Kingdom of Hawaii.

== See also ==
- Taylor, William Alexander; Taylor, Aubrey Clarence (1899). Ohio statesmen and annals of progress: from the year 1788 to the year 1900 ... Vol. 1. State of Ohio. p. 102.
- Milligan, Fred J. (2003). Ohio's Founding Fathers. Lincoln, Nebraska: iUniverse. ISBN 0595750397. OCLC 53472872.

U.S. House of Representatives
Preceded by District created	Member of the U.S. House of Representatives from Ohio's 4th congressional district 1813–1817	Succeeded by Samuel Herrick
Ohio Senate
Preceded by Josiah Dillon	Senator from Belmont County; 1809–1813	Succeeded by Charles Hammond
