= Jenkins's trans-Allegheny raid =

Raid of the American Civil War

- Part of the American Civil War
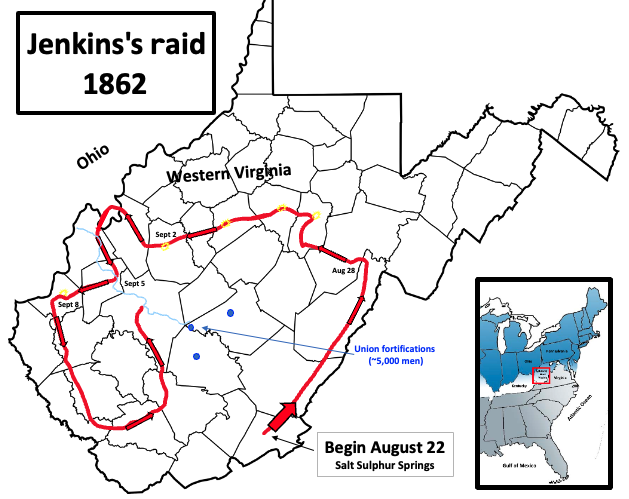
- Jenkins's route
Date	August 22 – September 19, 1862
Location	Western Virginia (now West Virginia) and Ohio

Belligerents
United States (Union)	Confederate States

Commanders and leaders
Col. John C. Rathbone; Col. John C. Paxton; Ltc. William H. H. Russell	Br Gen. Albert G. Jenkins: Col. James Corns

Units involved
District of the Kanawha: Various local forces; 2 VA Loyal Cav Reg; 4 VA Loyal Inf Reg	Dept. of SW Virginia: Jenkins Brigade

Strength
~ varied by location	~ 550

Casualties and losses
~1,300	7
- Note: Jenkins was sent to attack the Baltimore and Ohio Railroad and cut off a Union retreat from the Kanawha River Valley to Ohio.

Jenkins's trans-Allegheny raid was a Confederate cavalry expedition in the American Civil War that took place in Western Virginia (now West Virginia) and Ohio during August and September 1862. The raid was led by Brigadier General Albert G. Jenkins, and it started on August 22 as a preliminary step in Confederate Major General William W. Loring's military campaign to drive the Union Army out of the Kanawha River Valley. This campaign, known as the Kanawha Valley Campaign of 1862, took place from September 6 through September 16. The purpose of Jenkins's raid was to get behind the Union Army outposts located near the beginning of the Kanawha River, and cut off their main route of retreat to the safety of Ohio.

On the journey to his destination, Jenkins was able to capture several towns and seize valuable supplies and weaponry. He crossed the Ohio River into the state of Ohio, becoming the first Confederate force to invade the state. He moved back into Virginia and reached Buffalo, Virginia, on September 5. By occupying a position along the Kanawha River between the Union Army and Ohio, he completed his assignment to block the Union Army's most direct route of retreat. On the same day, Loring began a march with four brigades toward the Union outposts.

On September 8 Jenkins and a small detachment of his men were attacked by a detachment from the 2nd Loyal Virginia Cavalry, but Jenkins escaped. Although Union leaders believed Jenkins had been removed as a threat, Jenkins was able to regroup and move south up the Guyandotte River. He eventually circled north and waited where the Coal River empties into the Kanawha River. Union Brigadier General Joseph Andrew Jackson Lightburn, in his retreat after a defeat in the Battle of Charleston on September 13, avoided Jenkins by taking a road north towards Ripley, Virginia, instead of following the turnpike along the Kanawha River.

== Background ==
The Commonwealth of Virginia ratified an Ordinance of Secession that declared secession from the United States on May 23, 1861, and later joined other southern states in the Confederate States of America. Many people in the western portion of Virginia preferred to remain loyal to the United States, and they declared their own statehood on October 24, 1861—but the region did not officially become the state of West Virginia until June 20, 1863. In the southern half of western Virginia, many of the people from the mountains were pro-Union, while the majority in the large valleys were pro-Confederate. Bushwhackers and Partisan rangers utilized guerrilla warfare for both sides to help gain control of the region. The Kanawha Valley was important to the Confederacy because of its salt deposits and its potential for new army recruits. (Note: Salt, an essential part of the diet for humans and livestock, was also used for preserving meat during the 1860s.)

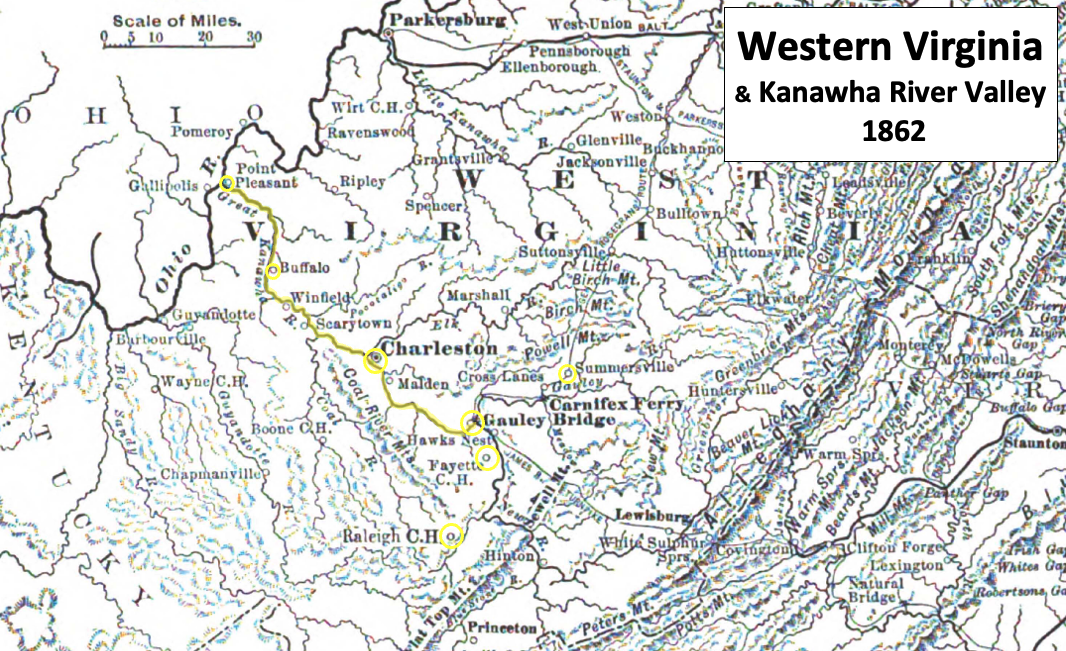
The Kanawha River Valley was important to the Confederacy

During 1861, Union forces commanded by Brigadier General Jacob Dolson Cox gained control of a large portion of southwestern Virginia along the Kanawha River Valley. The western portion of Virginia had few good roads and few settlements. Using small steamboats from the Ohio River, the Kanawha River could be navigated for about 70 miles (110 km) to a point about 10 miles (16 km) upstream from Charleston, which meant the river could be used to transport troops and supplies. Further upstream (with non-navigable portions), the Kanawha River is formed by the meeting of the New River and the Gauley River at the community of Gauley Bridge. This community was important not only for its river connections, but also because the James River and Kanawha Turnpike ran through it and was intersected by another road that ran northeast to Summersville and beyond.

On August 14, 1862, Cox began moving most of his division to Washington to reinforce another Union Army. A small quantity of troops remained near the Kanawha Valley, and were put under the command of Colonel Joseph Andrew Jackson Lightburn. Soon after Cox left the Kanawha Valley, some Union Army records were captured, and Confederate leaders learned Cox had left only 5,000 men in the Kanawha Valley at posts around Gauley Bridge. Major General William W. Loring was ordered to clear the Kanawha Valley of Union soldiers, and then move northeast to join more Confederate soldiers in the Shenandoah Valley. Part of Loring's plan to eliminate the Union Army included having a cavalry force move 500 miles (800 km) through Union–controlled territory to a point on the Kanawha River between Gauley Bridge and the Ohio River—which would block the best route for a Union retreat.

== Opposing forces ==
=== Confederate Army ===
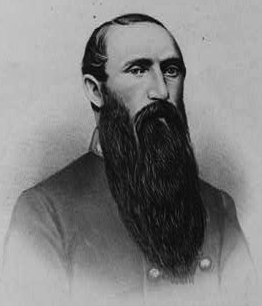
Albert G. Jenkins

Major General Loring commanded the Department of Southwestern Virginia. Before he began his objective to drive the Union Army out of the Kanawha Valley, he wanted to have a force behind the Union Army that would cut off the major Union retreat route to the safety of Ohio. This blocking force consisted of cavalry commanded by Brigadier General Albert G. Jenkins. Under his command were seven companies from the 8th Virginia Cavalry Regiment led by Colonel J. M. Corns, and five more companies of mounted soldiers led by Captain W. R. Preston. Many of Preston's soldiers would eventually become part of the 14th Virginia Cavalry Regiment. At the start of the raid, Jenkins's entire force numbered 550 to 600 soldiers, although its size varied during the raid.

=== Union Army ===
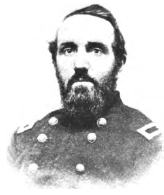
J. A. J. Lightburn

Colonel Lightburn assumed command of the Kanawha District on August 17, 1862. His headquarters were located at Gauley Bridge. Under his command were seven infantry regiments and one cavalry regiment, but very few of these forces confronted Jenkins. Once Lightburn knew Jenkins was between Lightburn's Union force and the Ohio River, he sent six companies from the 2nd Loyal Virginia Cavalry Regiment, plus three companies from the 4th Loyal Virginia Infantry Regiment, to find and confront Jenkins. The cavalry was commanded by Colonel John C. Paxton, and the infantry detachment was commanded by Lieutenant Colonel William H. H. Russell. (Note: Because of the mixed loyalties in Virginia, the state provided regiments for both the Union and Confederate armies. The 2nd Loyal Virginia Cavalry was a (loyal) Union regiment, that should not be confused with the 2nd Virginia Cavalry Regiment that was in the Confederate Army. After the state of West Virginia was created from the western portion of Virginia on June 20, 1863, the Union regiments from Virginia were renamed as West Virginia regiments, causing the 2nd Loyal Virginia Cavalry to become the 2nd West Virginia Cavalry.) Company B from the 2nd Loyal Virginia, led by Major William Powell, fought against Jenkins's men and almost captured Jenkins. The other forces that fought Jenkins at various locations in western Virginia were stationed far from Gauley Bridge and not directly under Lightburn's command. One of the larger Union forces was stationed at Spencer, Virginia, and consisted of five companies of the 11th Loyal Virginia Infantry Regiment. Their commander was Colonel John C. Rathbone. Also at Spencer was a company of independent scouts known as the "Snakehunters", commanded by Captain John P. Baggs. Rathbone's force totaled to about 300 men, although 100 men were poorly-equipped or unarmed.

== Jenkins moves north ==
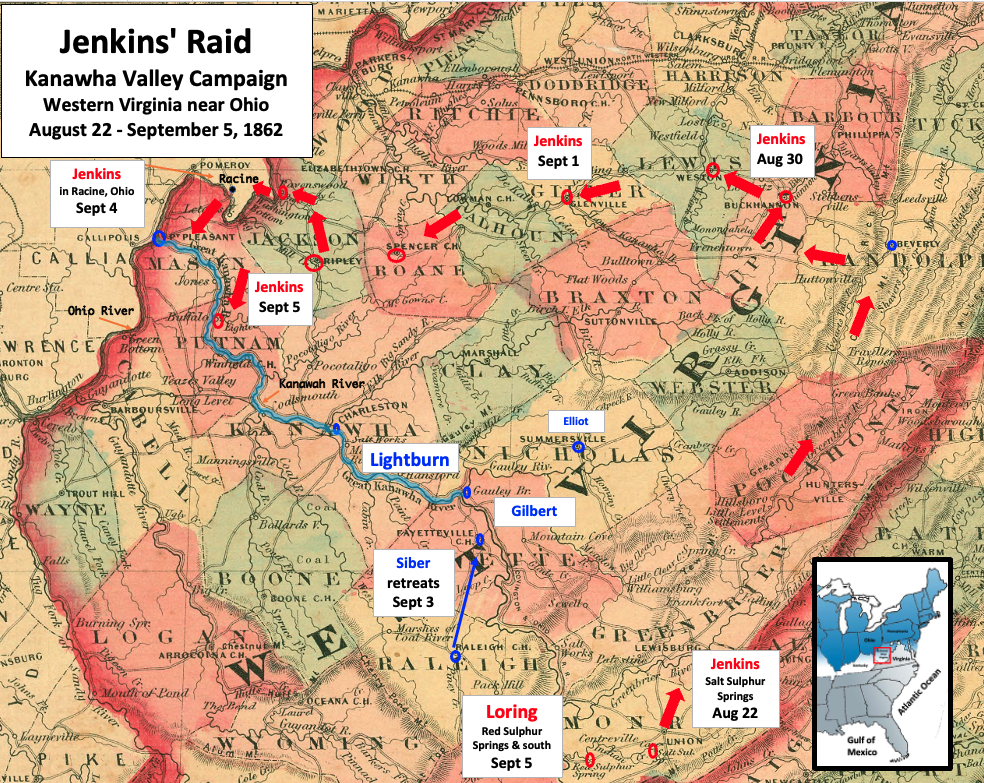
Loring planned to attack the Union force after Jenkins circled behind and cut off the Union path for retreat.

Confederate Major General Loring planned to take control of the Kanawha River Valley by leading a large force in an assault of Union forces located in Raleigh, Fayette, and Kanawha counties. As part of the plan, he needed to wait for Jenkins to get behind the Union fortifications to block a Union retreat down the Kanawha River. Lightburn eventually received reports that Loring was at Lewisburg (he was actually further south) with a force of 10,000 troops. Loring's force actually consisted of about 5,000 men instead of the rumored 10,000, but he expected to add to it by recruiting and organizing existing local militias. (Note: One author (Francis Lightburn Cressman) claims that Loring reported a force of only 5,000 men, lower than its actual size, to downplay his numerical advantage and make his victories appear as difficult accomplishments.)

=== To the railroad ===
On August 22, Jenkins began his mission to attack the Baltimore and Ohio Railroad and then move to the rear of Lightburn's Union force. At least one historian believes that Loring knew Jenkins would not be able to damage the railroad, but the railroad portion of the mission was a diversionary movement that would draw attention away from Loring's front—and also draw attention away from Jenkins's principal goal of cutting off the Union route of retreat. Jenkins began this mission by moving north from Salt Sulphur Springs. He quickly found it necessary to send one company in the opposite direction to approach the Kanawha River from the south side instead of the north. He also left another company behind because it did not have enough ammunition. The size of his mounted force was about 550 soldiers.

Jenkins's route began with a northern movement in the Cheat River Valley. On August 28, Jenkins encountered six Union pickets about 15 miles (24 km) south of a Union post near Beverly. Here he learned the much larger force at the Union post, which blocked his path to the railroad, would be difficult to attack. Although Jenkins was temporarily joined by 300 irregular cavalrymen commanded by Colonel John Imboden, he decided to bypass the Union fortification. Imboden occupied the Union soldiers while Jenkins moved west for the second part of his mission. Jenkins's artillery was sent back to Salt Sulphur Springs, while the remaining force struggled west on a crude bridle path across Randolph County's Rich Mountain.

== Jenkins moves west toward Ohio ==
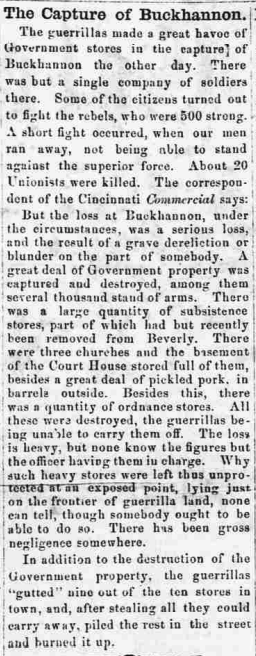
Jenkins captured numerous supplies at Buckhannon

=== Buckhannon ===
After moving through Randolph County, Jenkins turned north on August 30 and began moving down French Creek to the community of Buckhannon, the county seat of Upshur County. During this movement, his men were often harassed by pro-Union Home Guard. Arriving near Buckhannon close to 3:00 pm, Jenkins approached the town with all but two companies dismounted. Waiting for the Confederates were an untested light artillery company, a company of militia, and a new company of 60 regulars from the 10th Loyal Virginia Infantry Regiment. The Union companies were deployed on Water Tank Hill, causing some locals to now call this fight the "Battle of Water Tank Hill".

After firing a round or two, the Union forces fled and Jenkins captured the town. Jenkins reported casualties of four wounded. He also reported Union casualties of 12 to 15 killed or wounded, and 20 taken prisoner—including the Union commander Captain Marsh. The entire Union force was said by Marsh to number about 200. Using captured arms and ordnance, Jenkins was able to resupply his poorly-armed men with Enfield and Harper's Ferry rifles. Anything else of value was destroyed. At midnight, Jenkins began moving west toward Weston.

=== Weston and Glenville ===
Many of the communities encountered by Jenkins were small. For example: the 1860 U.S. census lists the population of Weston as 820. Glenville had a population of 398, and Spencer had a population of 196. Jenkins arrived at Weston at dawn on August 31. It was raining and foggy, which allowed the six companies from the 6th Loyal Virginia Infantry Regiment to escape from town before Jenkins surrounded it. The Union commander, Lieutenant Henry Hoy, remained in town and joined Jenkins's men in plundering. Late that evening, Jenkins began moving west toward Gilmer County. (Note: Lieutenant Colonel Daniel E. Frost, of the 11th Loyal Virginia Infantry, claimed Hoy was a Union spy that would help keep track of Jenkins's location.)

By 11:00 am on September 1, Jenkins was close enough to see the small community of Glenville in the distance. Glenville was defended by the 165th Militia, Gilmer County. The militia fired two volleys at Jenkins's advance guard before fleeing into the woods. Jenkins's men rested for the remainder of the day at Glenville, and then they resumed their westward march at midnight.

=== Spencer ===
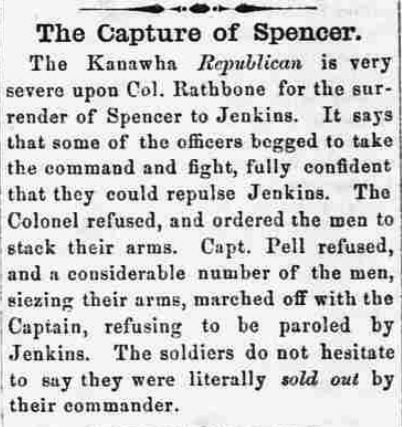
Jenkins captured Spencer without a fight

Colonel John C. Rathbone was the Union commander at the small community of Spencer. He was also involved with oil fields at Burning Springs. Rathbone's force numbered about 300, including at least 45 men from an independent company known as the "Snakehunters". On the morning of September 2, Rathbone received information that Confederate cavalry were moving toward Spencer. He did not make any adjustments to his pickets, and did not send a detachment to find the enemy force.

Jenkins arrived at Spencer around 4:00 pm. He posted his men on nearby hills with the line stretched thin to give the illusion that his force was larger than what it was. He sent three men under a flag of truce to negotiate a surrender of the Union force. Rathbone summoned all officers to a council of war, and he was urged to remain in town and fight. Concerned Rathbone was going to surrender, about 70 men left town and escaped. Rathbone and his second–in–command, Major George Trimble, believed they were surrounded by as many as 1,100 men. Rathbone surrendered unconditionally, and arms were stacked. Without firing a shot, 218 soldiers surrendered. Jenkins and his men entered town, and they destroyed weapons and supplies other than what they took for themselves. They paroled 170 men. The locals hated Captain Baggs and his Snakehunters, so the Snakehunters asked to go with Jenkins because they were afraid of retaliation from the town's citizens. The incident became known as "Rathbone's Folly". It caused Rathbone and Trimble to be dismissed for cowardly conduct from the Union Army on January 6, 1863. Rathbone had his dismissal revoked on May 18, 1866.

=== Ohio ===
Jenkins left Spencer on the morning of September 3, and arrived at Ripley in the evening. The town is only 12 miles (19 km) from the Ohio River. He found no resistance from the town. A Union Army paymaster was captured along with $5,525. Further west, news of the surrender at Spencer arrived at the town of Ravenswood, which is located on the Virginia side of the Ohio River. Lieutenant Colonel Daniel E. Frost of the 11th Loyal Virginia Infantry (and brother-in-law of Rathbone) was in charge of the Union Army post at Ravenswood. His scouts were at Ravenswood when Jenkins entered Ripley. The town evacuated people and military supplies.

Jenkins arrived at Ravenswood around 11:00 am on September 4. As he approached, about 250 defenders fled the town and crossed the Ohio River. Jenkins's men rested in town and took supplies from local stores. Occasionally, they were shot at by locals on the Ohio side of the river. Just before sunset, Jenkins brought a portion of his command over the Ohio River into Ohio. This was the first Confederate invasion of Ohio, and the crossing was made at Sand Creek Riffle. Jenkins left a portion of his men in Virginia with instructions to meet on the Virginia side at Point Pleasant near the mouth of the Kanawha River. Colonel James Corns of the 8th Virginia Cavalry Regiment commanded this group. In Ohio, Jenkins took possession of the town of Racine. He warned the locals he would burn the town if his soldiers were harmed. He also stated his purpose in Ohio was to obtain horses and supplies. Although he did not burn the town, he caused panic in Ohio and nearby states. After midnight, he crossed back into Virginia at Wolf's Bar near Racine.

== Jenkins moves into position on Kanawha River ==
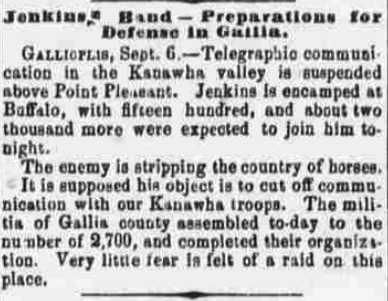
Ohio newspapers expressed concern about Jenkins

Jenkins met Colonel Corns about six miles (9.7 km) from Point Pleasant, Virginia. The town was located where the Kanawha River emptied into the Ohio River, and had a sheltered defending force. Early in the raid, Jenkins had sent his artillery away, so an attack on Point Pleasant would be difficult. Instead, Jenkins made a feint toward Point Pleasant, but took his command to the small town of Buffalo located up the Kanawha River. His mission was accomplished by September 5, and Union forces upriver were not sure of his location. An Ohio newspaper believed he had 1,500 men, and 2,000 more were expected to join him. On the next day, Loring began moving north toward the Union outposts near the Kanawha River.

The news of Loring advancing from the south, plus Jenkins deployed between Lightburn and Ohio, reached the Union camps in early September. A large portion of the 2nd Loyal Virginia Cavalry, commanded by Colonel John C. Paxton, was sent to find and confront Jenkins. In addition, three companies from the 4th Loyal Virginia Infantry were also sent to pursue Jenkins. Their commander was Lieutenant Colonel William H. H. Russell. On September 8, the Union cavalry discovered Jenkins had his headquarters at the William C. Miller house near Barboursville, and Jenkins was thought to be planning a move toward Charleston on the next day. That evening, Major William H. Powell led a company of cavalry to the Miller house. The house was surrounded, but Jenkins and his staff had already escaped through the rear garden. The entire Confederate force abandoned its camp and fled up the Guyandotte River towards Logan and Wyoming counties. (Note: Jenkins's September 19 report simply says he proceeded to Logan Court House, and then Wyoming Court House to convey his new recruits behind the lines. At the time of the American Civil War, some of the small county seats were identified with the county name followed by "Court House". For example, Beckley, Virginia (later Beckley, West Virginia) is identified on some maps as "Beckley", but it is identified in other maps as "Raleigh C.H." or Raleigh Court House. Beckley is the county seat of Raleigh County.)

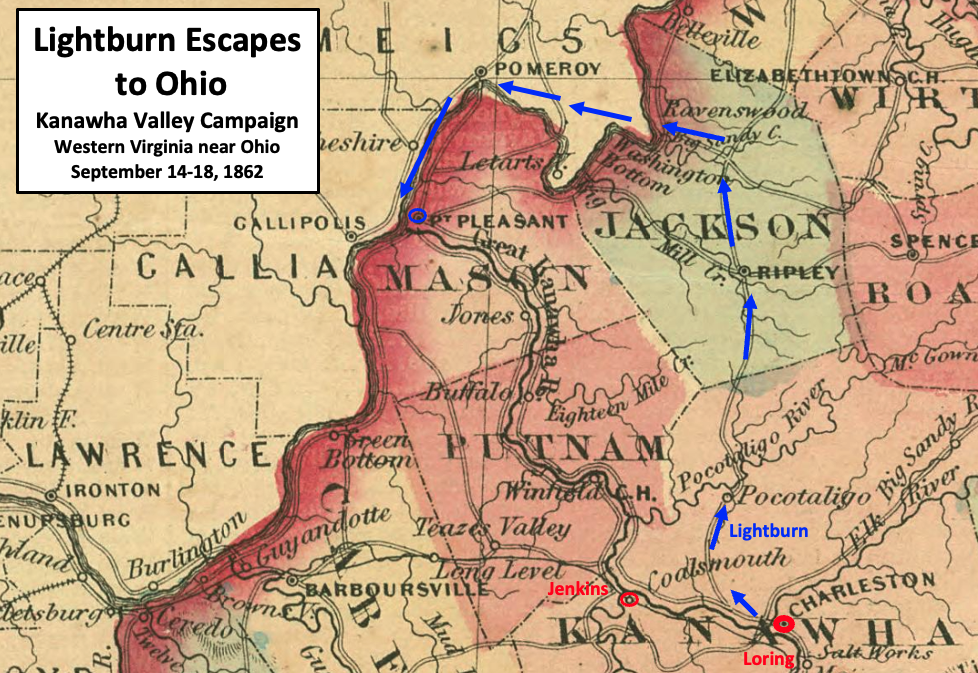
Lightburn retreated north on the Ripley Road instead of risking a confrontation with Jenkins on the road to Point Pleasant.

Over the next week, Loring attacked Union troops in the counties near the beginning of the Kanawha River. His first major victory was achieved in Fayetteville on September 10, and the two sides skirmished at points between Fayetteville and Charleston such as Cotton Hill and Montgomery's Ferry. Although news of the event at Barboursville led Lightburn to believe the threat from Jenkins was eliminated, this was not entirely true. During Loring's fighting in Fayette County, Jenkins moved his troops to Logan Court House and then Wyoming Court House. Unable to communicate with Loring, he eventually moved his men west to Kanawha County at the mouth of the Coal River (a.k.a. Coalsmouth) in an attempt to block any Union retreat.

Lightburn continued a retreat down the Kanawha River, using a turnpike that ran adjacent to the river. His troops were defeated by Loring in the Battle of Charleston on September 13. Lightburn burned a bridge across the Elk River at Charleston and continued his retreat. Fearing Jenkins's men or Confederate militia were waiting further down the Kanawha River, Lightburn took a road north to Ripley and crossed the Ohio River at Ravenswood. His troops then moved on the Ohio side of the river to a location opposite Point Pleasant at the mouth of the Kanawha River. Loring had driven Lightburn's Union Army out of the Kanawha River Valley and back to Ohio.

== Aftermath ==
The Official Record labels Jenkins's raid as "Jenkins' Expedition in West Virginia and Ohio", and uses the dates of August 22 – September 19, 1862. Historian Terry Lowry calls the event "Jenkins' Trans-Allegheny Raid", and his book's chapter devoted to the raid ends on September 9, 1862.

In Loring's September 20 report, he praised Jenkins and claimed Jenkins "captured and paroled near 300 prisoners of war; killed, wounded, and dispersed about 1,000 of the enemy; reclaimed to the Government about 40,000 square miles, then in the possession of the enemy...destroyed at least 5,000 stand of small–arms, one piece of cannon, and immense stores...." Jenkins's report mentions only seven Confederate casualties, and it says nothing about the event at the Miller house near Barboursville. Cox wrote "little real mischief was done" by Jenkins's raid, but it was one of the causes of Lightburn's "embarrassing" retreat. Cox was ordered to return to the Kanawha Valley and promoted to major general. On October 14, he was at Point Pleasant preparing to retake the valley. By October 30, Union troops occupied Charleston, and began moving further east.

In December 1862, Lightburn was transferred to the XV Corps commanded by Major General William T. Sherman, and he became a brigade commander. He was eventually promoted to brigadier general. He was slightly wounded in the face on August 24, 1864. He recovered from his wound and continued serving until he resigned on June 22, 1865. Jenkins did not survive the war. He led a brigade in the Battle of Gettysburg, and he was wounded on July 2, 1863. He recovered by autumn that year, and returned to operate in western Virginia. Jenkins was wounded and captured on May 9, 1864, in the Battle of Cloyd's Mountain. He died from his wound on May 24 in Dublin, Virginia. After the war, Cox became governor of Ohio. He also served as secretary of the interior in President Grant's administration, and served in the United States House of Representatives.

=== Preservation ===
Highway markers commemorate some of Jenkins's exploits in his 1862 raid. One exists at Salt Sulphur Springs in West Virginia's Monroe County. Another marker, titled Capture of Spencer, is located in Roane County at Spencer. Three historical markers commemorate the invasion of Ohio by Jenkins. In West Virginia, a highway marker titled "Ohio River Ford" marks the spot at Ravenswood where Jenkins (and Lightburn) crossed into Ohio. An additional marker discusses Daniel Frost, and it mentions his newspaper was burned during Jenkins's raid. On the Ohio side, a historical marker titled "First Ohio Invasion" discusses the invasion, and is placed at Buffington Island north of the actual crossing point.

== See also ==
- Gen. Albert Gallatin Jenkins House
- List of West Virginia Civil War Confederate units
- List of West Virginia Civil War Union units
- West Virginia in the Civil War

== Notes ==
=== References ===
- Cox, Jacob Dolson (1900). Military Reminiscences of the Civil War Volume I - April 1861 – November 1863. New York City: Charles Scribner's Sons. ISBN 978-3-84951-384-9. Archived from the original on February 10, 2023.
- Evans, Clement A., ed. (1899). Confederate Military History: A library of Confederate States History.... (Volume II). Atlanta, Georgia: Confederate Publishing Company. OCLC 951143. Archived from the original on May 26, 2022.
- Guiley, Rosemary Ellen (2019). Big Book of West Virginia Ghost Stories. Guilford, Connecticut: Globe Pequot. ISBN 978-1-49304-399-6. OCLC 1108619435.
- Lowry, Terry (2016). The Battle of Charleston and the 1862 Kanawha Valley campaign. Charleston, West Virginia: 35th Star Publishing. ISBN 978-0-96645-348-5. OCLC 981250860.
- MacCorkle, William Alexander (1916). The White Sulphur Springs; the Traditions, History, and Social Life of the Greenbriar White Sulphur Springs. Charleston, West Virginia: W.A. MacCorkle. OCLC 11083303. Archived from the original on November 11, 2023.
- Scott, Robert N., ed. (1885). The War of the Rebellion: a Compilation of the Official Records of the Union and Confederate Armies Series I Volume XII Part II. Washington, DC: Government Printing Office. OCLC 427057. Archived from the original on May 31, 2022.
- Scott, Robert N., ed. (1887). The War of the Rebellion: a Compilation of the Official Records of the Union and Confederate Armies Series I Volume XIX Part I. Washington, DC: Government Printing Office. OCLC 427057. Archived from the original on May 23, 2022.
- Snell, Mark A. (2012). West Virginia and the Civil War : Mountaineers are Always Free. Charleston, SC: History Press. ISBN 978-1-61423-390-9. OCLC 1051048067.
- Starr, Stephen Z. (1981). Union Cavalry in the Civil War. Vol. II: The War in the East from Gettysburg to Appomattox 1863–1865. Baton Rouge, Louisiana: Louisiana State University Press. OCLC 4492585.
- Sutton, Joseph J. (2001) [1892]. History of the Second Regiment, West Virginia Cavalry Volunteers, During the War of the Rebellion. Huntington, WV: Blue Acorn Press. ISBN 978-0-9628866-5-2. OCLC 263148491.
