= Joseph Kimball =

Medal of Honor recipient (1844–1910)

- Civil War era Army Medal of Honor
- Born: October 6, 1844; Littleton, New Hampshire
- Died: May 1, 1910 (aged 65); Peoria State Hospital; Bartonville, Illinois
- Burial place: Evergreen Cemetery (Bloomington, Illinois)
- Military career
- Allegiance: United States of America
- Branch: United States Army
- Rank: Private
- Units: Company B, 2nd West Virginia Cavalry
- Conflicts: Battle of Sailor's Creek; American Civil War
- Awards: Medal of Honor

Joseph A. Kimball (October 6, 1844 – May 1, 1910) was an American soldier who fought in the American Civil War. Kimball received his country's highest award for bravery during combat, the Medal of Honor. Kimball's medal was won for his capturing the flag of the Confederate 6th North Carolina Infantry at the Battle of Sailor's Creek in Virginia on April 6, 1865. He was honored with the award on May 3, 1865.

Kimball was born in Littleton, New Hampshire, and entered service in Ironton, Ohio. He was buried in Bloomington, Illinois.

== Medal of Honor citation ==
Rank and organization: Private, Company B, 2d West Virginia Cavalry. Place and date: At Sailors Creek, Va., 6 April 1865. Entered service at: Ironton, Ohio. Birth: Littleton, N.H. Date of issue: 3 May 1865.

Kimball's's official Medal of Honor citation reads:

The President of the United States of America, in the name of Congress, takes pleasure in presenting the Medal of Honor to Private Joseph Kimball, United States Army, for extraordinary heroism on 6 April 1865, while serving with Company B, 2d West Virginia Cavalry, in action at Deatonsville (Sailor's Creek), Virginia, for capture of flag of 6th North Carolina Infantry (Confederate States of America).

== See also ==
- List of American Civil War Medal of Honor recipients: G–L
