= Gen. Albert Gallatin Jenkins House =

Historic house in West Virginia, United States

- U.S. National Register of Historic Places
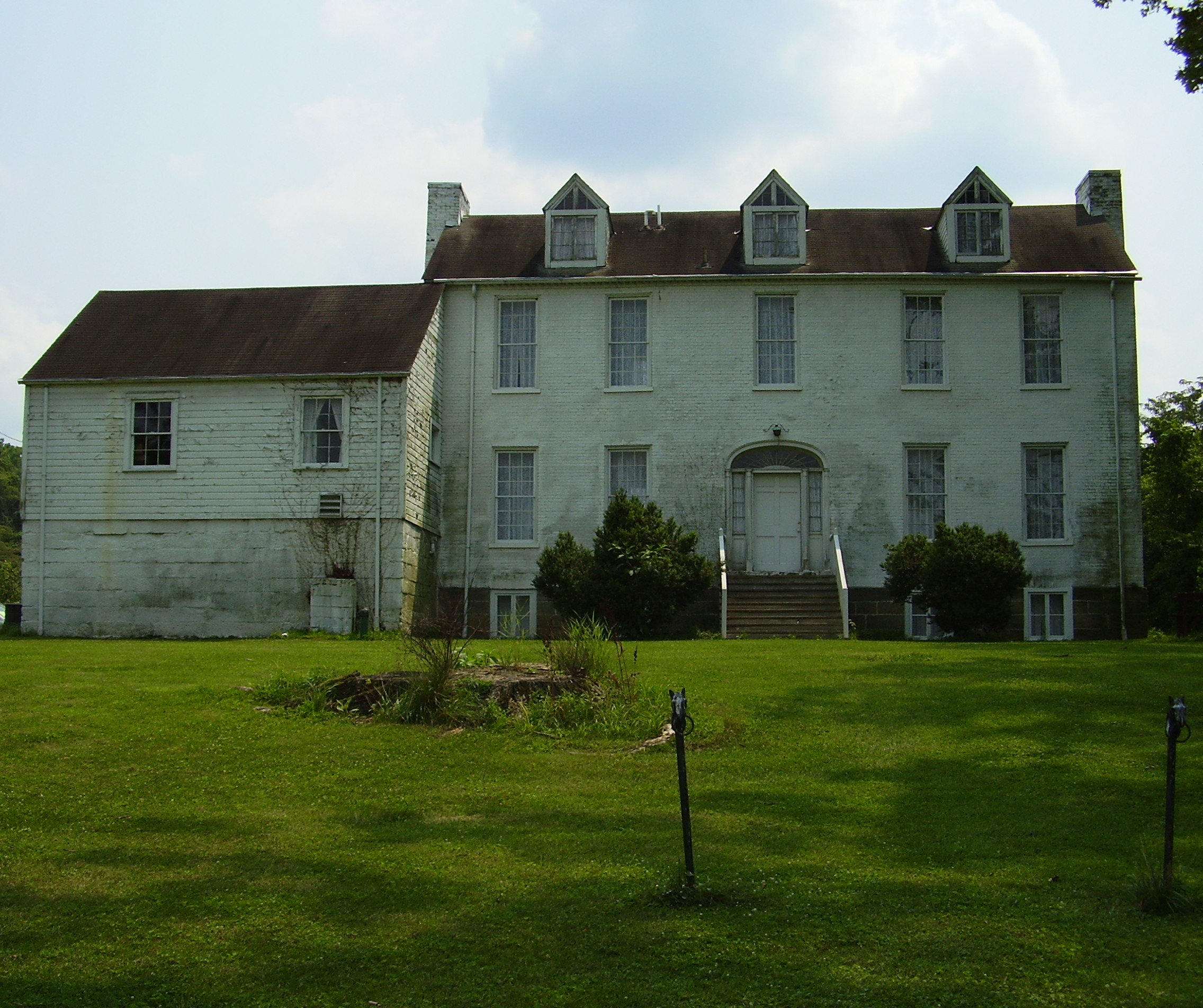
- The Gen. Albert Gallatin Jenkins House ("Green Bottom") in 2006

- Location within West Virginia Location within the United States
- Location: 8814 Ohio River Rd., near Lesage, West Virginia
- Coordinates: 38°35′12″N 82°14′58″W
- Area: 4 acres (1.6 ha)
- Built: Ca. 1835
- Architectural style: Federal
- NRHP reference No.: 78002791
- Added to NRHP: May 22, 1978

The Gen. Albert Gallatin Jenkins House — known historically (along with its 4,395 acre estate) as "Green Bottom" — is located on the east bank of the Ohio River about 7 miles north of Lesage, Cabell County, West Virginia.

The plantation house was built about 1835, and is a 2 1/2-story, rectangular, brick dwelling in a late period Federal style. It sits on a sandstone foundation and the interior has a center hall, single pile plan.

The most prominent resident was Albert Gallatin Jenkins (1830–1864), a two-term member of the U.S. House of Representatives (1857–61), who then joined the Confederate States Army in the Civil War, attaining the rank of brigadier general before dying of wounds received in battle in 1864.

The house is open as a museum operated by the West Virginia Division of Culture and History. It was listed on the National Register of Historic Places in 1978.

== See also ==
- National Register of Historic Places listings in Cabell County, West Virginia
- List of museums in Huntington, West Virginia
