= Albert G. Jenkins =

American politician (1830–1864)

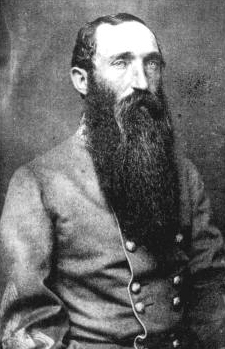
- Jenkins in uniform, c. 1862

Member of the U.S. House of Representatives from Virginia's 11th district
- In office March 4, 1857 – March 3, 1861
- Preceded by: John S. Carlile
- Succeeded by: John S. Carlile

Personal details
- Born: Albert Gallatin Jenkins; November 10, 1830 Cabell County, Virginia (present-day West Virginia), U.S.
- Died: May 21, 1864 (aged 33) Pulaski County, Virginia, C.S.
- Resting place: Spring Hill Cemetery; Huntington, West Virginia, U.S.
- Party: Democratic
- Education: Jefferson College; Harvard Law School

Military service
- Allegiance: Confederate States
- Branch/service: Confederate States Army
- Rank: Brigadier-General
- Battles/wars: American Civil War; Battle of Scary Creek; Jenkins's trans-Allegheny raid; Battle of Hurricane Bridge; Battle of Gettysburg; Battle of Cloyd's Mountain (DOW)

Albert Gallatin Jenkins (November 10, 1830 – May 21, 1864) was an American politician who served as a senior officer of the Confederate States Army. He served two terms in the United States Congress from 1857 to 1861 and later the First Confederate Congress.

== Early life and education ==
Jenkins was born to the wealthy plantation owner Capt. William Jenkins and his wife Jeanette Grigsby McNutt in Cabell County, in what was then Virginia. After a private education, he attended Marshall Academy when he was fifteen. He graduated from Jefferson College in Canonsburg, Pennsylvania, in 1848 and from Harvard Law School in 1850.

== Political career ==
Admitted to the Virginia bar the same year, Jenkins practiced in Charleston. In 1859, he inherited part of his father's sprawling slave plantation. He was named a delegate to the Democratic National Convention in Cincinnati in 1856. That same year, he was elected as a Democrat to the Thirty-fifth and then, in 1858, to the Thirty-sixth United States Congress, serving from 1857 to 1861.

== American Civil War ==
With the outbreak of the Civil War and Virginia's subsequent secession, Jenkins resigned from Congress in early 1861. He raised a company of mounted partisan rangers, which by June was enrolled in the Confederate Army as a part of the 8th Virginia Cavalry, with Jenkins as its colonel. The company was first organized to protect a Virginia flag that had been raised in Guyandotte, which they did until April 20, 1861. He fought at the Battle of Scary Creek on July 17, 1861, taking command of the confederate force when George S. Patton was wounded, and defeating the Union forces. By the year's end, his men had become such a nuisance to the Federals in western Virginia that military governor Francis H. Pierpont appealed to President Abraham Lincoln to send in a strong leader to stamp out the rebellion in the area. Early in 1862, Jenkins was elected as a delegate to the First Confederate Congress. After promotion to brigadier general on August 1, 1862, he returned to active duty. Throughout the fall, his men harassed Union troops and supply lines, including the vital Baltimore and Ohio Railroad.

In September, Jenkins's cavalry raided northern Kentucky and now West Virginia. They briefly entered extreme southern Ohio across from Ravenswood, West Virginia, becoming one of the first organized Confederate units to enter a Northern state. By November 1862, a grand jury in Cabell County returned misdemeanor indictment against Jenkins, however no copy of these indictments remain. These legal issues most likely came about from Jenkins's raiding in the area. In December, Robert E. Lee requested that Jenkins and his men transfer to the Shenandoah Valley.

After spending the winter foraging for supplies, he led his men on a raid in March 1863 through western Virginia, seeking to influence the popular vote which ultimately created the state of West Virginia. During the Gettysburg campaign, Jenkins's brigade formed the cavalry screen for Richard S. Ewell's Second Corps. Jenkins led his men through the Cumberland Valley into Pennsylvania and seized Chambersburg, burning down nearby railroad structures and bridges. During their invasion of Pennsylvania, his brigade, under Jenkins's direction, abducted hundreds of African Americans (most of them free people of color with a few being fugitive slaves), all of whom were forcibly sent southwards and sold into slavery.

He accompanied Ewell's column to Carlisle, briefly skirmishing with Union militia at the Battle of Sporting Hill near Harrisburg. During the subsequent Battle of Gettysburg, Jenkins was wounded on July 2 and missed the rest of the fighting.

Jenkins did not recover sufficiently to rejoin his command until fall 1863, and spent the early part of 1864 in and around Monroe County, West Virginia, assembling cavalry units for John C. Breckinridge's Department of Western Virginia.

=== Battle of Cloyd's Mountain ===
By early May, the Confederates in southwestern Virginia had learned that a large Union force under Brig. Gens. George Crook and Brig. Gen. William W. Averell, had departed Charleston, and was rapidly approaching, undoubtedly with the aim of striking the vital Virginia and Tennessee Railroad in the region. At the same time came news that 200 miles to the north, a Union force under Maj. Gen. Franz Sigel, was making a simultaneous advance in the lower Shenandoah Valley. Sigel's force posed the greater immediate danger, because of its proximity and potential to threaten the left flank of Gen. Lee's main Confederate army while it was engaged against Grant in central Virginia.

Despite the imminent arrival of Crook and Averell's force, Breckinridge received orders on May 4, to hastily move, with all the infantry of his department, to the Shenandoah Valley, where he could confront Sigel. Breckinridge complied, leaving his headquarters at Dublin, Virginia on the evening of May 5, and sending a dispatch to Jenkins appointing him as new Commander of the Department of Western Virginia.

Hearing that Union Brig. Gen. George Crook had been dispatched from the Kanawha Valley with a large force, Jenkins took the field to contest the Federal arrival. On May 9, 1864, he was severely wounded and captured during the Battle of Cloyd's Mountain, a Union victory which destroyed the last railroad line connecting Tennessee and Virginia.

A Union surgeon amputated Jenkins's arm, but he never recovered, dying twelve days later. He was initially buried in New Dublin Presbyterian Cemetery. After the war, his remains were reinterred at his home in Greenbottom, near Huntington, West Virginia. He was later reinterred in the Confederate plot in Spring Hill Cemetery in Huntington.

== Legacy ==
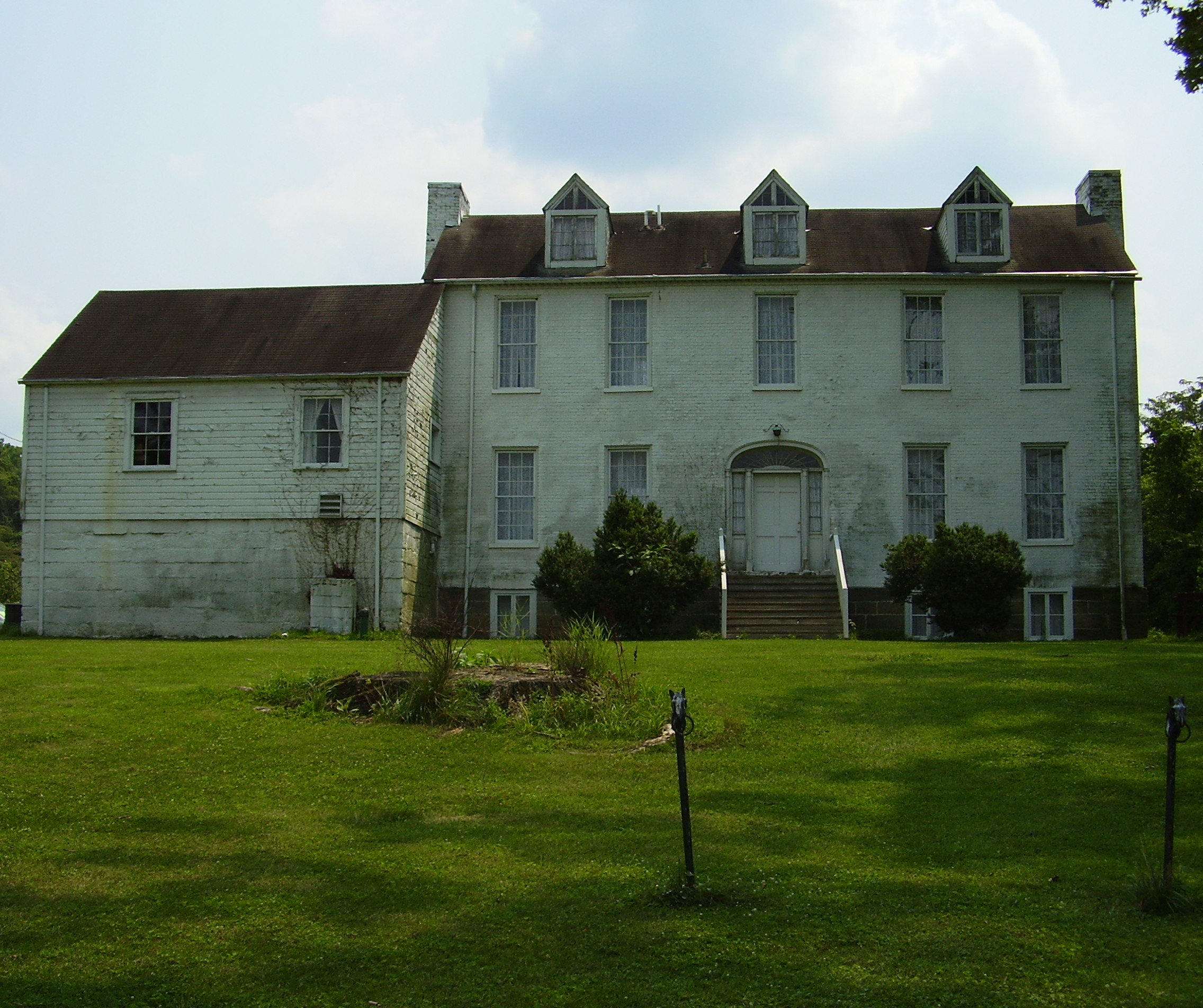
Green Bottom, Jenkins's home, is currently being restored as a museum.

Jenkins's home, Green Bottom, is now operated by the U.S. Army Corps of Engineers. In 1937, Marshall University constructed Jenkins Hall, naming it in honor of the Confederate cavalry officer. In 2018, the university reviewed the name given Jenkins's history as a slaveholder and staunch defender of slavery. They chose to keep the name while contextualizing the history of racism and slavery. On July 7, 2020, the Marshall University Board of Governors voted unanimously to remove the name from its education building.

In 2005, a monument to General Jenkins was erected in Mechanicsburg, Pennsylvania, commemorating his service during the Gettysburg Campaign. In the summer of 2020, the monument was removed.

== Personal life ==
Albert Jenkins married Virginia Southard Bowlin of St. Louis, Missouri, on July 15, 1858. Together they had four children, James Bowlin, Alberta Gallatin, Margaret Virginia, and George.

== See also ==
- List of American Civil War generals (Confederate)

U.S. House of Representatives
| Preceded by John S. Carlile | U.S. Representative for Virginia's 11th Congressional District; 1857–1861 | Succeeded by John S. Carlile |
Confederate States House of Representatives
| Preceded by none | C.S.A. Representative for Virginia's 14th Congressional District; 1861–1862 | Succeeded by Samuel Augustine Miller |
