= 2nd West Virginia Infantry Regiment =

United States Civil War military unit

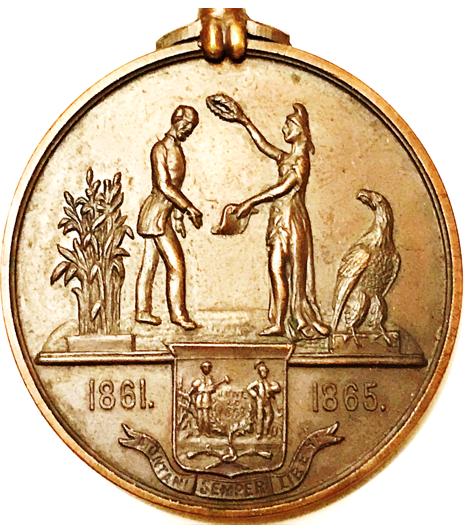
- West Virginia honorable discharge medal
- Active: May 21, 1861 to January 26, 1864
- Country: United States
- Allegiance: Union
- Branch: Infantry
- Engagements: American Civil War 1861: Battle of Cheat Mountain; 1862: Battle of McDowell, Battle of Cross Keys, Battle of Groveton, Second Battle of Bull Run 1863: Battle of White Sulphur Springs, Battle of Droop Mountain

Commanders
- Colonel: John W. Moss 1981-1862
- Colonel: George R. Latham 1862-1864

The 2nd West Virginia Infantry Regiment was an infantry regiment that served in the Union Army during the American Civil War. Half of its companies were recruited from southwestern Pennsylvania. The other half of its companies were recruited from northwestern Virginia (eventually West Virginia) and Ohio regions near the Ohio River. The regiment was known as the 2nd Virginia Infantry prior to the creation of the state of West Virginia, and should not be confused with the Confederate 2nd Virginia Infantry Regiment.

The regiment conducted all of its fighting in Virginia and West Virginia. After May 1862, its commander in the field was usually Colonel George R. Latham. Until the spring of 1863, it usually fought as part of a brigade commanded by Brigadier General Robert H. Milroy. During May and June 1863, the regiment was converted to a mounted infantry by Brigadier General William W. Averell. During 1863 the mounted regiment was part of three of Averell's raids that threatened the Confederate Virginia and Tennessee Railroad. The major battles that were part of these raids were the Battle of White Sulphur Springs and the Battle of Droop Mountain.

On January 26, 1864, the regiment was reorganized as the 5th West Virginia Cavalry Regiment. On the same day, the 3rd West Virginia Infantry Regiment, which had been a mounted infantry and was often part of the same infantry brigade, was reorganized as the 6th West Virginia Cavalry Regiment. On December 14, 1864, the remaining battalion of the 5th West Virginia Cavalry was absorbed by the 6th West Virginia Cavalry.

== Background and organization ==
=== Background ===
Fighting in the American Civil War began on April 12, 1861. The state (or commonwealth) of Virginia seceded from the United States on April 17, 1861, and joined seven southern states (three additional states seceded later) in the Confederate States of America. In the northwestern portion of Virginia, many people (especially non-slaveholders) preferred to remain loyal to the United States (a.k.a. the Union). Many others from this region remained loyal to Virginia and fought for the Confederacy. Virginians loyal to the United States approved pursuing their own statehood on October 24, 1861, and the northwestern portion of Virginia officially became the state of West Virginia on June 20, 1863.

During the Civil War and prior to the creation of West Virginia, the Confederacy had a 2nd Virginia Infantry Regiment, as did the Union. Reports from Union officers made early in the war sometimes referred to the loyal Union regiments as Virginia regiments. To avoid confusion, authors typically call the pro-Union Virginia regiments "West Virginia" regiments. Adding to the potential confusion for the Union's 2nd West Virginia Infantry Regiment, it became a mounted infantry regiment in 1863, and became the 5th West Virginia Cavalry Regiment in 1864. Toward the end of the year it was consolidated into the 6th Virginia Cavalry Regiment. Effective December 10, 1864, the 1st and 4th West Virginia Infantry regiments were combined into a new unit named 2nd West Virginia Veteran Infantry Regiment, and this unit has no relationship with the original 2nd West Virginia Infantry Regiment.

=== Organization ===
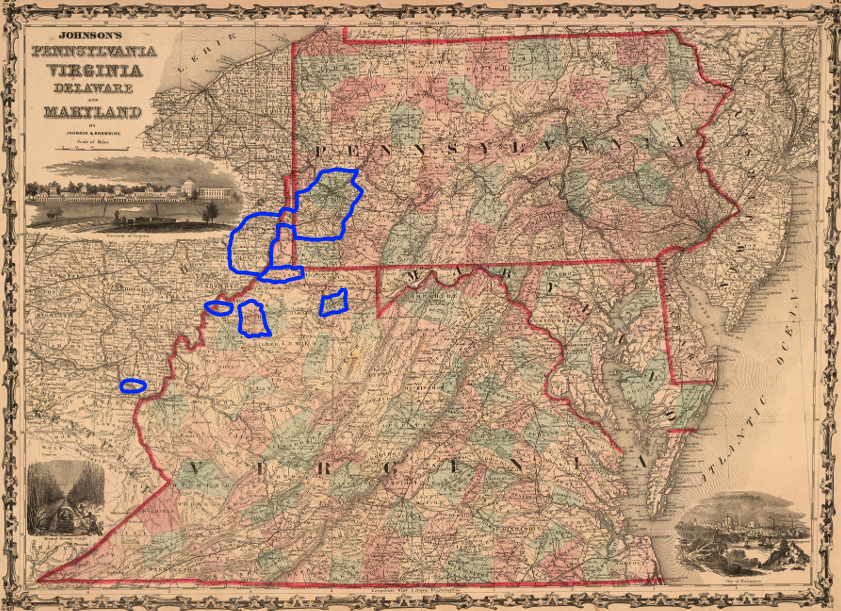
2nd Virginia recruitment area (circled)

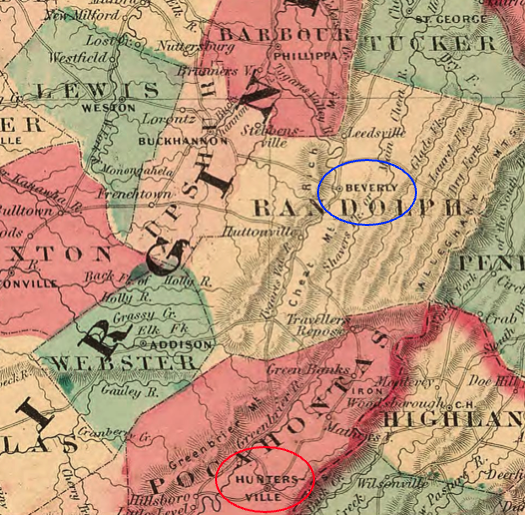
The 2nd West Virginia Infantry spent significant time near Beverly, (West) Virginia

Original leaders of the regiment were Colonel John W. Moss, Lieutenant Colonel Robert Moran, and Major James D. Owen. All three were commissioned effective July 3, 1861. Among captains that would eventually be promoted were George R. Latham, Thomas Gibson, Douglas D. Barclay, Alexander Scott, and Patrick McNally. The companies served as detachments until they were brought together in Beverly, Virginia, during late July 1861. The 2nd West Virginia Infantry Regiment was the first Union regiment in Virginia (later West Virginia) enlisted for three years of service. A Wheeling newspaper called the regiment "2nd Virginia Regiment" in a July 17, 1861, article.

The regiment's Company A was organized in Pittsburgh, Pennsylvania, during April 1861. It was not accepted by the state, so it moved to Wheeling, Virginia (now West Virginia), and was mustered in on May 21, 1861. Companies D, F, and G were also from Pittsburgh and mustered in at Wheeling. (Note: Company D was armed with Springfield muskets.) Other companies from outside of Virginia were: Company H from Ironton, Ohio; and Company I from Washington County, Pennsylvania. The companies organized solely in Virginia were: Company B in Grafton; and Company C in Wheeling. Two companies had soldiers from multiple states. Company E was from Belmont County, Ohio; Monroe County, Ohio; and three Virginia counties—Ritchie, Taylor, and Wetzel. Company K was from Parkersburg, Virginia; and Bridgeport, Ohio. (Note: Dyer lists Company E as being from Wheeling. Reader and Lang list Company E from counties in Ohio and Virginia.)

West Virginia regiments were typically smaller than the average size because of the difficulties of recruiting in a state with mixed loyalties. The average regiment size during the American Civil War was about 1,000 when they were first organized. Each regiment had ten companies consisting of 97 enlisted men and three officers. In the case of the 2nd West Virginia Infantry and its successor, the 5th West Virginia Cavalry, it had a total enrollment of 1,069 (including replacements after the initial organization). Immediately after the regiment was organized, Company B was detached to Belington, Virginia, where it protected the area from Confederate guerrillas patrolling the mountains. Before 1862, sixty–five soldiers were discharged, and Company G was detached for artillery service.

== Service as infantry ==
Several of the companies served before they were designated as part of the 2nd West Virginia Infantry. For example: the unit that became Company A was known as the "Washington Rifle Guards". During May, June, and July 1861 it provided service guarding the Baltimore & Ohio Railroad, as the body guard for Major General George B. McClellan, and participated in the Western Virginia campaign during the first half of July—all before it became Company A of the 2nd West Virginia Infantry during July. Once the companies of the regiment were unified, they were stationed in Beverly through September 11, 1861. On September 12 the regiment was sent to Elkwater, Virginia (now West Virginia). On the next day, it helped lead the attack in the Battle of Cheat Mountain against Confederate General Robert E. Lee, and drove the Confederates from their camp near a foot hill by the mountain. The regiment was led by Colonel Moss.

On November 13, the regiment's Company G was detached for artillery service. On January 7, 1862, the regiment was ordered to a Union camp on the top of Cheat Mountain where they relieved the 9th Indiana Infantry Regiment. They remained at the summit of the mountain for almost three months, conducting mostly picket and guard duty. From this windy and snowy camp they could see a Confederate camp across the valley in the Allegheny Mountains. Company B rejoined the regiment on January 22. At the end of March 1862, more regiments joined the 2nd West Virginia Infantry at the top of Cheat Mountain, and by April the regiment became part of Milroy's Brigade in the Mountain Department. The Mountain Department was led by Major General John C. Frémont.

=== Frémont and the Mountain Department ===
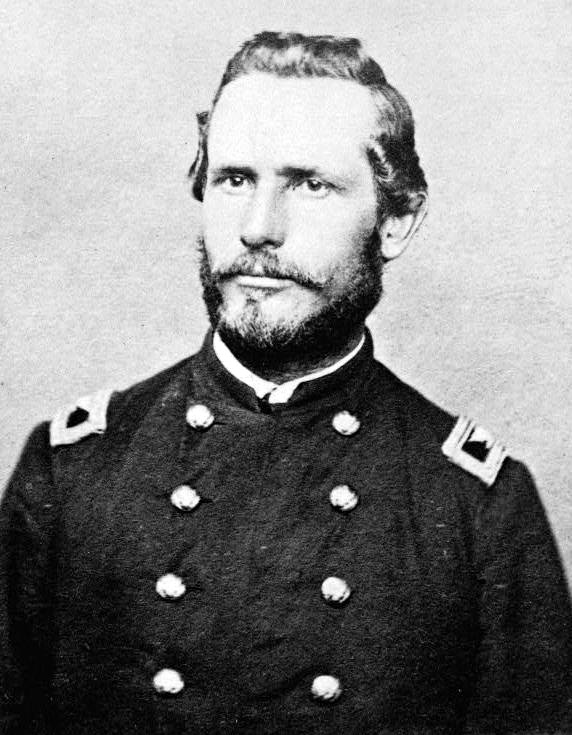
Col. Latham

The 2nd West Virginia Infantry Regiment is credited with fighting in the Battle of McDowell on May 8, 1862, while part of a brigade commanded by Brigadier General Robert H. Milroy. Company B did some fighting, but the remainder of the regiment was held back in support of the artillery. Union forces were defeated by an army commanded by Major General Thomas J. “Stonewall” Jackson. Milroy's casualty report did not list the 2nd West Virginia Infantry.

The regiment's Colonel Moss and Lieutenant Colonel Moran resigned during late May, and Company B's Captain George R. Latham was promoted to colonel commanding the regiment. (Note: The regiment's Colonel John W. Moss was a doctor. Although he resigned from the regiment during May 1862, he became the regimental surgeon for the 14th West Virginia Infantry Regiment during August 1862. He served until he died of disease on January 2, 1864. Lieutenant Colonel Robert Moran resigned from the regiment for health reasons, and had to be taken away by ambulance.) Captain Alexander Scott of Company F was promoted to lieutenant colonel around that time. (Note: Lowry says Scott was promoted on "either May 20 or July 1, 1862". Lang lists Captain Alexander Scott of Company F as promoted to lieutenant colonel on May 20, 1862. Yet Lang lists Scott's date of commission as lieutenant colonel as June 30, 1863. The regimental historian (Reader) notes that Scott "was in all the battles in which the regiment took part....") On May 21 Latham led a force of 500 soldiers in the capture a gang of bushwhackers, while Major James D. Owens commanded the remaining portion of the regiment.

The regiment continued to be part of Milroy's Brigade, and fought in the June 8 Battle of Cross Keys. Milroy's Brigade consisted of the 2nd, 3rd, and 5th West Virginia Infantry regiments; plus the 25th Ohio Infantry, a detachment of the 1st West Virginia Cavalry, and three light artillery batteries. Casualties for the regiment were three killed, 19 wounded, and two captured or missing. Major Owens commanded the regiment.

=== Pope and the Army of Virginia ===
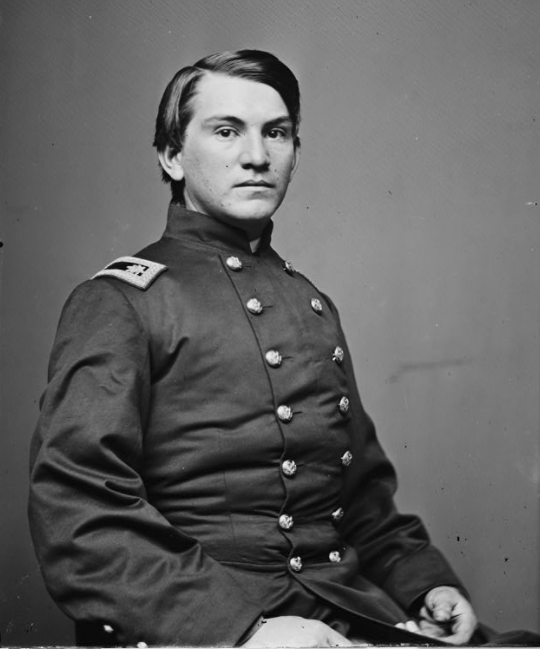
Major Gibson

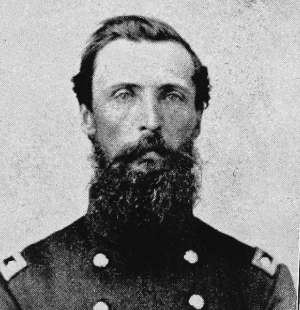
Lt. Col. Scott

On June 26, 1862, Major General John Pope became commander of the newly organized Union Army of Virginia. The regiment continued as part of Milroy's Independent Brigade, only now it was part of the 1st Army Corps in Pope's Army of Virginia. Fremont refused to accept command of the 1st Army Corps, so Major General Franz Sigel was named commander, and he assumed command on June 30. Milroy's Brigade led the advance as Pope's Army moved toward Sperryville, Virginia, on July 4. Major Owens resigned effective July 7, making him the third of the regiment's top three original officers to resign. Company D's Captain Thomas Gibson was appointed major on that day, with a commission date of July 31.

The 1st Corps arrived at Culpeper, Virginia, on the morning of August 9. They remained there until the evening, and could hear the Battle of Cedar Mountain nearby. At that time they were rushed to the front, but did not engage in any serious fighting. The regiment is listed as participating in the August 9 defeat in the battle, but the entire 1st Army Corps (including the 2nd West Virginia Infantry) is not listed in the casualties report.

For the period of August 16 through September 2 (Pope's Campaign in Northern Virginia), the regiment's fighting included the First Battle of Rappahannock Station (a.k.a. Waterloo Bridge) on August 23–25, and Second Battle of Bull Run (a.k.a. Gainesville) beginning on August 28. Casualties for the regiment during the period were 24 killed, 90 wounded, and 24 missing or captured. This totaled to 138 casualties of the brigade's 437. During the fighting at Second Bull Run on August 29, the regiment lost about one fifth of its soldiers present. Lieutenant Colonel Scott lost his horse to gunfire while he was riding; and Lieutenant Hamilton B. James of Company E was killed.

=== Changes in command ===
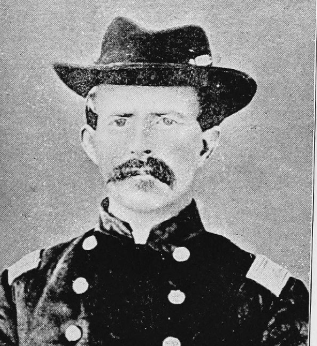
Maj. McNally

By September 3, the exhausted regiment camped near Washington, D.C., and the Army of Virginia was merged into the Army of the Potomac. The regiment remained there until September 29, and then returned to western Virginia. The trip west took the regiment to Pittsburgh by railroad before moving on to western Virginia. Major Gibson, a Pittsburgh native, resigned to accept a position as one of the original majors of the newly recruited 14th Pennsylvania Cavalry Regiment that was mustered into service on November 23. The 2nd West Virginia Infantry's Captain Henry C. Flesher of Company F was promoted to major, with a commission date effective November 11, 1862.

With the exception of detachments for guard duty, the regiment spent most of its wintertime at Beverly. During December, the regiment was detached from Major General Milroy after he was promoted. In January 1863 the regiment became part of the District of West Virginia, Department of Ohio, and the brigade was commanded by Colonel Augustus Moor. (Note: The regimental historian lists the new brigade commander as "Brig. Gen. Moor", and the brigade as the "Northern Brigade". Another author says Colonel Augustus Moor "was assigned command of the Northern Brigade in January of 1863".) Major Flesher resigned effective February 22, 1863, and Captain Patrick McNally of Company H was promoted to major with a commission date of March 16.

During May, Brigadier General William W. Averell became commander of the 4th Separate Brigade in western Virginia, and the regiment became part of this brigade. At that time Averell decided to permanently transfer Company G, and it became Battery G of the 1st West Virginia Light Artillery Regiment. The regiment was sent to Grafton on June 15 where it was mounted, becoming known as the 2nd West Virginia Mounted Infantry. Now with only nine companies, the regiment became part of a brigade consisting of three mounted infantry regiments, one cavalry regiment, one cavalry battalion, and one artillery battery.

== Service as mounted infantry ==
By the summer of 1863, the regiment became known as the 2nd West Virginia Mounted Infantry. It participated in two major battles as part of Averell's 4th Separate Brigade, the Battle of White Sulphur Springs and the Battle of Droop Mountain. The battles happened during the first two of three raids led by Averell during the last half of 1863. Originating from West Virginia, the raids threatened Confederate Army bases and their supplies—and the railroads used to transport them. The brigade consisted of the 2nd, 3rd, and 8th West Virginia Mounted Infantry regiments; the 14th Pennsylvania Cavalry Regiment; Gibson's Battalion of Cavalry, and Battery G. Gibson's Battalion of Cavalry was led by Major Thomas Gibson, formerly of the 2nd West Virginia Infantry, and at various times consisted of as many as six companies of detached or independent cavalry companies.

=== White Sulphur Springs ===
==== Plan and movement toward Lewisburg ====
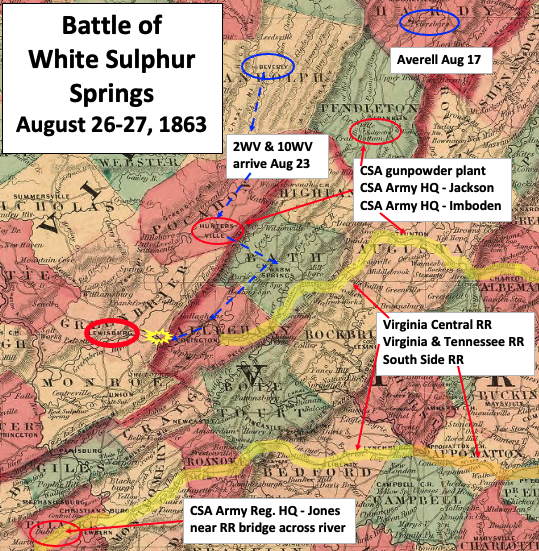
Union plan had three objectives, while Confederate leaders feared for the safety of their railroads

Averell, located near Moorefield, West Virginia, received orders dated August 12 to go to Lewisburg, West Virginia, and eliminate any enemy force stationed there. While there, he was to take possession of the law books in the law library of the Virginia Supreme Court of Appeals located in the town, and bring the books to the Union fortification in Beverly, West Virginia. Targets enroute included a Confederate regiment headquartered in Huntersville and a saltpeter and gunpowder works.

Averell and a portion of his brigade (without the 2nd West Virginia), after receiving supplies, departed from Petersburg, West Virginia, on August 17. (Note: In 1863, Petersburg was part of Hardy County, West Virginia. In 1866, a portion of the county including Petersburg became Grant County.) The Confederate regiment retreated from Huntersville before Averell arrived, and the 2nd West Virginia joined the brigade at that point on August 23. At that time, the regiment had roughly 350 soldiers available, although its men were better supplied with ammunition compared to the rest of the brigade.

Averell's brigade used a deceptive approach to Lewisburg, and Confederate Army leadership became concerned about the safety of two important railroads: the Virginia Central and the Virginia & Tennessee. Early in the morning on August 26, Averell's force approached White Sulphur Springs with the advance guard consisting of two companies from the 2nd West Virginia and two companies from the 8th West Virginia. The remainder of the 2nd West Virginia was next as part of a 4-mile (6.4 km) long column that including the other units.

The Union advance was intercepted near White Sulphur Springs, and not far from Lewisburg, by Confederate forces under the command of Colonel George S. Patton. At 9:30 am the Union advance guard was fighting—and requesting reinforcements. The Confederates were firmly entrenched with a barrier across the road. An open area and a corn field were in their front—between them and the Union force. Because of the terrain, it would be difficult for Averell's soldiers to flank the Confederates.

==== Fighting at White Sulphur Springs ====
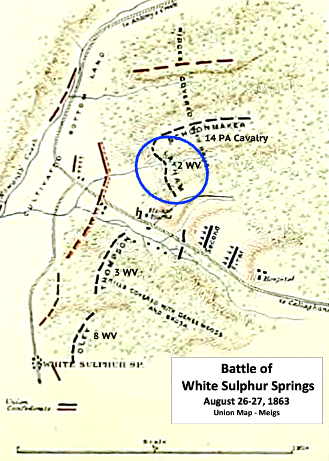
2nd WV Mounted Infantry circled on map

The 2nd and 8th West Virginia regiments began the fight dismounted, and artillery fire was exchanged. The 3rd West Virginia and 14th Pennsylvania were also ordered to the front, but it would take a while for them to get into position because they were miles back. By the afternoon, all four regiments were on the field, with the 2nd West Virginia on the right.

By blocking the road, the Confederates were preventing the Union Army from reaching Lewisburg. Around 4:00 pm Averell decided to attack the barrier on the road. He ordered a portion of the 14th Pennsylvania Cavalry to make a mounted charge against the Confederate troops behind the barrier. After an unsuccessful attack, the entire cavalry attacked. (Note: Confederate leadership called the action by the 14th Pennsylvania Cavalry a "furious charge", and the regimental historian for the 2nd West Virginia Infantry called one of the cavalry's charges "one of the most daring charges of the war". The 14th Pennsylvania Cavalry had 102 of the brigade's 218 casualties.) The infantry regiments were also ordered to attack at the same time. Colonel Latham commanded the 2nd West Virginia, and the right battalion of the 2nd West Virginia was commanded by Major McNally. The adjutant with Averell's orders could not find Latham, so McNally received the order. McNally led his battalion through the cornfield in the attack, but he was not supported by the remaining portion of the regiment. McNally's force was repulsed by the Confederate 22nd Virginia Infantry Regiment assisted by a portion of the 23rd Virginia Infantry Battalion, and he was captured after being mortally wounded.

Averell ordered a retreat during the morning of August 27. He was low on ammunition and did not receive expected reinforcements. His brigade rode back to Huntersville in about 28 hours while pursued by Confederate forces, and bushwhackers harassed them for most of the trip. They crossed the Greenbrier River Bridge less than seven miles (11 km) from Huntersville, and it was the only bridge across the Greenbrier River. There they met the 10th West Virginia Infantry Regiment with food for soldiers and horses. Although his brigade was chased by various Confederate forces during his retreat, it arrived to the safety of the camp at Beverly on August 31. The official report lists the brigade's casualties as 26 killed, 125 wounded, and 67 missing or captured. The 2nd West Virginia Mounted Infantry's portion of the casualties was five soldiers killed, 16 wounded, and eight captured or missing. Colonel Latham was slightly wounded in the foot, and Lieutenant Colonel Scott was wounded in his left arm. The Battle of White Sulphur Springs is also known as the Battle of Dry Creek or the Battle of Rocky Gap.

=== Droop Mountain ===
==== Averell's second raid ====
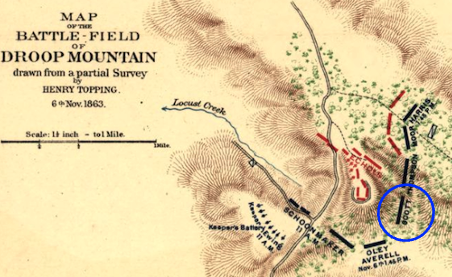
2nd West Virginia on Union right center

On October 26, 1863, Brigadier General Benjamin F. Kelley ordered Averell to move his command south from Beverly, West Virginia, and attack a Confederate force stationed near Lewisburg in Greenbrier County, West Virginia. After that portion of the raid was completed, he was to attack the Virginia and Tennessee Railroad near Dublin Station, including the railroad bridge over the New River. Droop Mountain was not part of the plan. A second Union force, departing from Charleston, West Virginia, was directed to meet Averell at Lewisburg.

On November 3, Confederate leadership became aware of Averell's movement south after a skirmish about 20 miles (32 km) north of Huntersville. The Confederate Army tried to stop Averell early in the morning on November 5 at Mill Point, but retreated to the crest of Droop Mountain, about 30 miles (48 km) from Lewisburg. To take the main road to Lewisburg, Averell would have to ascend the mountain. The 2nd West Virginia had three casualties in the Mill Point skirmish.

==== Battle on the mountain ====
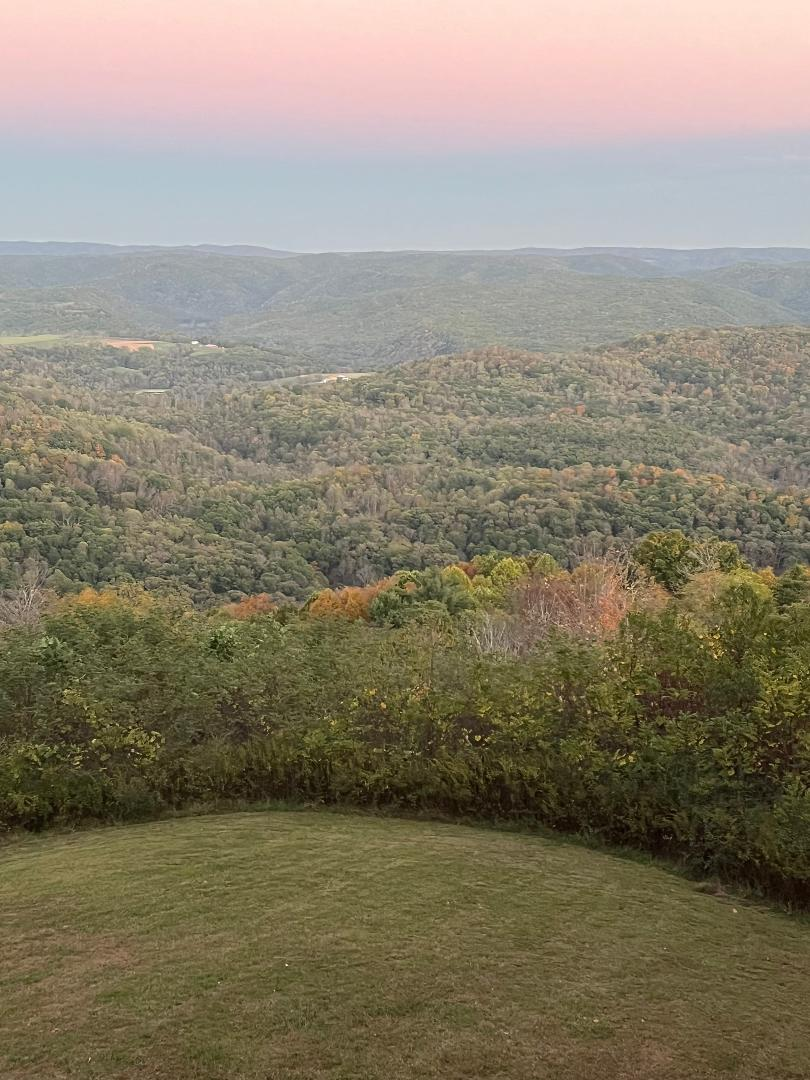
View from Tower on top of Droop Mountain in 2024

During the next morning, Averell sent Colonel Augustus Moor, with 1,175 mostly infantry soldiers, to the far right to flank the Confederate left. While the flanking movement was being made, the 14th Pennsylvania Cavalry Regiment with artillery, commanded by Colonel James M. Schoonmaker, made a demonstration against the Confederate right and center that would distract attention from the flanking movement. Once the flanking movement was in place, the Confederate left and center was attacked by the 2nd West Virginia, 3rd West Virginia, and 8th Ohio regiments. The attacks were made while dismounted, and the three-regiment force advanced up the mountainside while under artillery fire. The 2nd West Virginia was led by Lieutenant Colonel Scott.

The 2nd West Virginia Mounted Infantry consisted of 395 soldiers, and about 200 participated in the battle because of detachments. During the ascent, the 2nd West Virginia passed the 8th West Virginia and formed a line on the left of the 3rd West Virginia near the top of the mountain. Eventually the 2nd and 3rd West Virginia advanced into the Confederate breastworks at the top of the mountain. This would be the location where the 2nd West Virginia took its highest rate of casualties.

By 3:00 pm, Major Gibson's Cavalry Battalion was ordered forward to pursue the fleeing Confederates. Confederate leadership had become aware that another Union force was approaching from the west. By 4:00 pm the battle was over and the Confederates continued fleeing south. Averell's command reported 119 casualties in the battle. Included in that total are 23 casualties for the 2nd West Virginia Mounted Infantry: nine killed and 14 wounded. Among those killed was Lieutenant Arthur J. Weaver of the 2nd West Virginia Mounted Infantry. (Note: A study using Union surgeon reports and additional sources found Averell's losses as 45 killed or mortally wounded, 93 wounded, and two captured. The 2nd West Virginia had the highest casualties of the three-regiment group that assaulted the Confederate left-center, with nine killed, four mortally wounded, and 16 wounded.)

== End of service as mounted infantry ==
The regiment went on Averell's Salem Raid during December 1863. Averell's force consisted of four regiments, one battalion, and an artillery battery. This was another raid with an objective of destroying infrastructure belonging to the Virginia and Tennessee Railroad. It was part of an effort to help Union troops under siege in Knoxville, Tennessee (Siege of Knoxville), by cutting the railroad line that resupplied the Confederate troops. Lieutenant Colonel Scott commanded the regiment. After moving in rain and snow, Averell's force reached Salem, Virginia, on December 16. Only six hours were spent destroying railroad infrastructure because Averell discovered that a Confederate cavalry brigade was on a train moving to Salem. A difficult return trip north ensued as six separate Confederate commands tried to catch Averell in difficult weather. Averell's December 21 report said that his command moved 355 miles (571 km) since December 8. The 2nd West Virginia Mounted Infantry had one soldier wounded; and one corporal and 19 privates were captured near Covington, Virginia, on December 19.

The regiment was converted to the 5th West Virginia Cavalry Regiment on January 26, 1864. At the same time, the 3rd West Virginia Mounted Infantry was converted to the 6th West Virginia Cavalry Regiment. Because of the expiration of many of the soldier's three-year enlistments, the 5th West Virginia Cavalry Regiment was consolidated to a battalion during September 1864. Effective December 14, that battalion was combined into the 6th West Virginia Cavalry Regiment. Including the time spent as a cavalry unit, the regiment lost three officers and 68 enlisted men killed or mortally wounded during the war. An additional 118 enlisted men died from disease.

== See also ==
- Medals of Honor for West Virginia Soldiers
- West Virginia Units in the Civil War
- West Virginia in the Civil War
