= Battle of Droop Mountain order of battle =

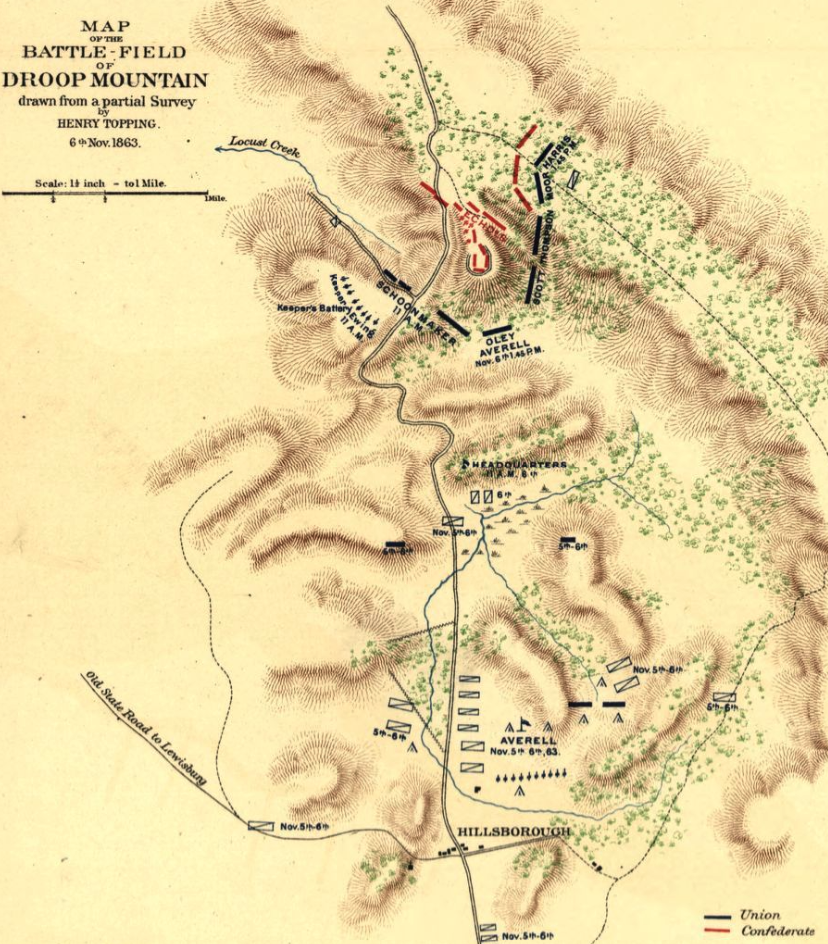
Averell's three-sided attack from north side

The following army units were involved in the Battle of Droop Mountain on November 6, 1863, near Hillsboro, West Virginia, in the American Civil War. Hillsboro, spelled "Hillsborough" on some maps from that century, is located in the mountainous terrain of Pocahontas County, West Virginia. A Union brigade commanded by Brigadier General William W. Averell defeated a smaller Confederate force commanded by Brigadier General John Echols and Colonel William L. "Mudwall" Jackson. A second Union force commanded by Brigadier General Alfred N. Duffié, tried to prevent the Confederate retreat, but did not engage at Droop Mountain. Aware of Duffié's troops, Confederate forces escaped before he arrived.

The Union Army units, and their commanders, are listed first. The Confederate Army units, and their commanders, follow. Many of the men on both sides were from West Virginia. In one case, Confederate Captain James McNeil of the 22nd Virginia Infantry Regiment was captured by the 3rd West Virginia Mounted Infantry—the regiment of McNeil's half brother, Private Alfred McKeever. Not shown is the Confederate force commanded by Brigadier General John D. Imboden, which did not arrive at Droop Mountain in time for the battle and unsuccessfully pursued Averell in the days after the battle.

== Abbreviations used ==
=== Military rank ===
- BG = Brigadier General
- Col = Colonel
- Ltc = Lieutenant Colonel
- Maj = Major
- Cpt = Captain
- Lt = 1st Lieutenant
- Pvt = Private

=== Other ===
- w = wounded
- k = killed

== Union Army Department of West Virginia ==
=== Fourth Separate Brigade ===
BG William W. Averell

Lt Jacob H. Mork, Acting Assistant Adjutant General
Lt John Rodgers Meigs, Engineer and Acting Aide-de-Camp
Lt Alexander J. Pentecost, Acting Quartermaster
Pvt Francis S. Reader, clerk

Group	Regiments and Others
Infantry Col Augustus Moor (28th Ohio Infantry)	10th West Virginia Infantry Regiment: Col Thomas M. Harris; 28th Ohio Infantry Regiment: Ltc Gottfried Becker; Additional Information: The 10th West Virginia Infantry numbered 569 men at Droop Mountain as Company I was detached to Grant County, West Virginia.; The 10th West Virginia Infantry was armed with .58 caliber Enfield rifles.; The 28th Ohio Infantry numbered 605 men at Droop Mountain.; The 28th Ohio Infantry was armed with .69 caliber "big bore" muskets.
Mounted Infantry Col John H. Oley (8th West Virginia Infantry)	2nd West Virginia Mounted Infantry Regiment: Ltc Alexander Scott; 3rd West Virginia Mounted Infantry Regiment: Ltc Francis W. "Frank" Thompson; 8th West Virginia Mounted Infantry Regiment: Maj Hedgman Slack; Additional Information: The 2nd West Virginia Mounted Infantry later became 5th West Virginia Cavalry Regiment.; The 2nd West Virginia Mounted Infantry numbered only 395 at Droop Mountain, and about 200 saw action.; The 3rd West Virginia Mounted Infantry later became the 6th West Virginia Cavalry Regiment.; The 8th West Virginia Mounted Infantry later became the 7th West Virginia Cavalry Regiment.; All three mounted infantry regiments were armed with short muzzle-loading .58 caliber Enfield rifles, sabers, and Colt's navy revolvers.
Cavalry Col James M. Schoonmaker (14th Pennsylvania Cavalry)	14th Pennsylvania Cavalry Regiment: Col James M. Schoonmaker; Gibson's Independent Cavalry Battalion: Maj Thomas Gibson (14th Pennsylvania Cavalry); 3rd West Virginia Cavalry Regiment, (Co. E, H, I): Maj Lot Bowen; 1st West Virginia Cavalry Regiment, (Co. A): Cpt Harrison H. Hagans; 16th Illinois Cavalry Regiment, (Co. C): Cpt Julius Jaehne; 3rd Independent Company Ohio Cavalry: Cpt Frank Smith (w); Additional Information: Company A of the 1st West Virginia Cavalry was also known as the Kelley Lancers.; Company C of 16th Illinois Cavalry was also known as the Chicago Dragoons.; Company C of the 16th Illinois Cavalry was part of a flanking maneuver, while the remainder of Gibson's Battalion was held in reserve or had picket duty until it pursued the enemy in retreat.; The cavalry regiment and battalion were armed with carbines.
Signal and Batteries	68th New York Infantry Regiment (Det. of Signal Corps): Cpt Ernst A. Denicke; Battery B, 1st West Virginia Light Artillery Regiment: Cpt John V. Keeper; Battery G, 1st West Virginia Light Artillery Regiment: Cpt Chatham T. Ewing; Additional Information: Battery B was also known as "Keeper's Battery".; Keeper's Battery had six guns.; Battery G was also known as "Ewing's Battery".

Approximately 3,900 men in brigade.

=== Duffié's Brigade, Scammon's 3rd Division ===
BG Alfred N. Duffié

Cpt Alexander H. Rictor, acting inspector general

Group	Regiments and Others
Infantry Col Carr B. White (12th Ohio Infantry)	12th Ohio Infantry Regiment: Ltc Jonathan D. Hines; 91st Ohio Infantry Regiment: Col John A. Turley
Mounted Infantry	34th Ohio Mounted Infantry Regiment: Col Freeman E. Franklin
Cavalry	2nd West Virginia Cavalry Regiment: Maj John J. Hoffman
Signal and Batteries	Simmonds' Battery Kentucky Light Artillery (one section): Cpt Seth J. Simmonds; Additional Information: Duffié's force did not directly engage in the Battle of Droop Mountain. Their movement toward Lewisburg caused the Confederates to retreat from Droop Mountain and escape through Lewisburg before Duffié arrived there. Duffié encountered enemy pickets at Little Sewell Mountain on November 6 and one company of cavalry west of Lewisburg on November 7.; The mounted part of Duffié's force totaled 970 officers and men with 1,025 horses.

Principal Union commanders
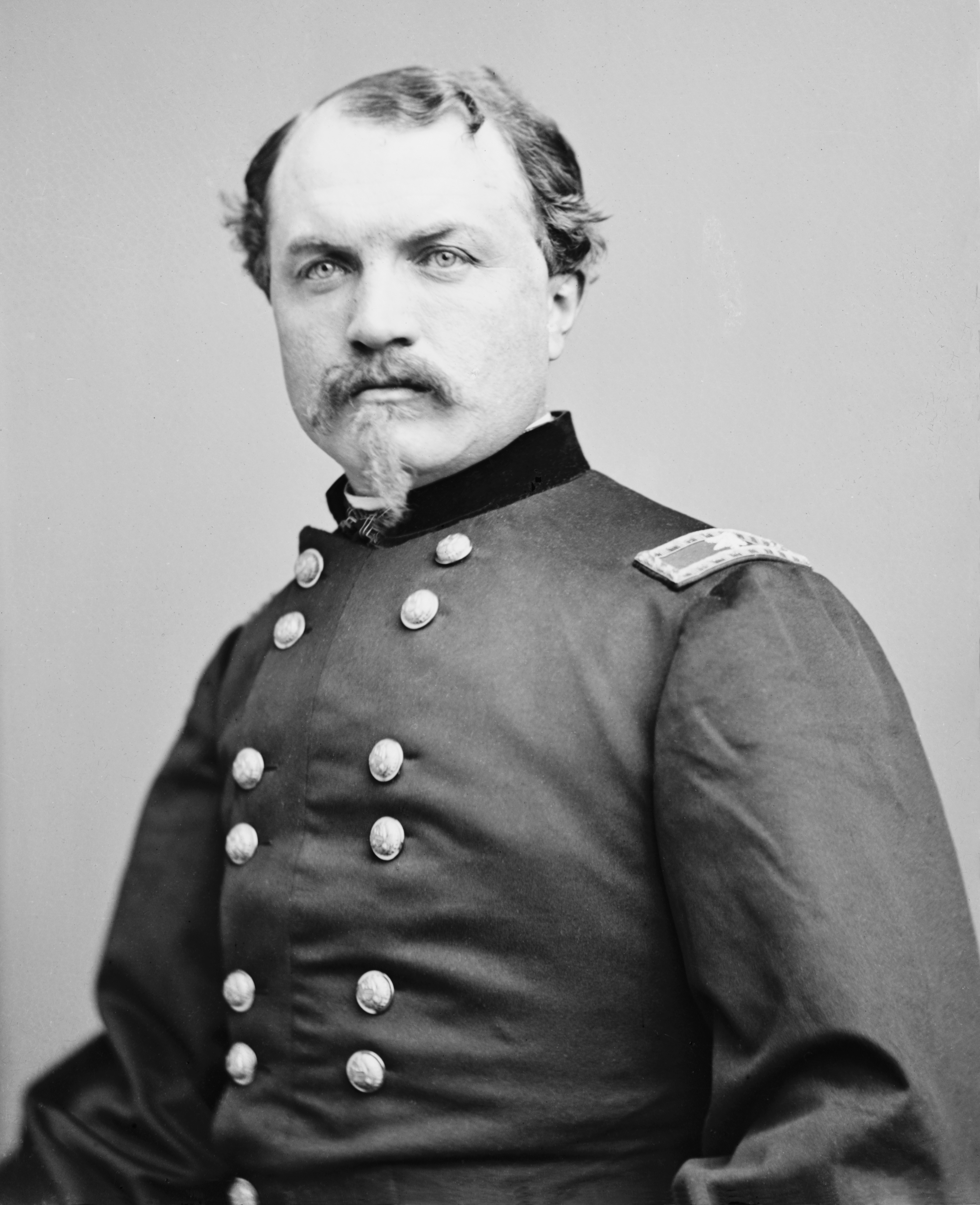
BG William W. Averell

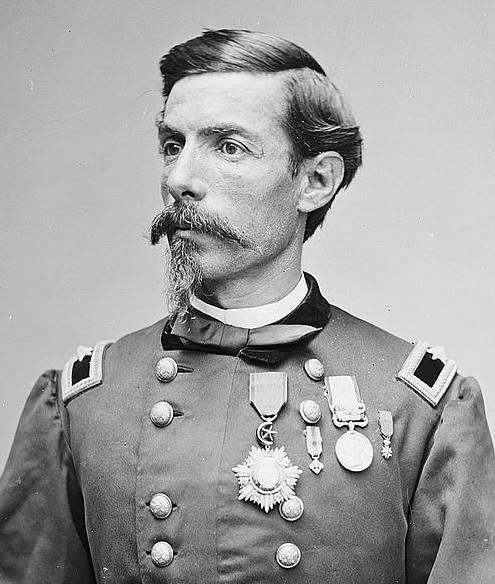
BG Alfred N. Duffié

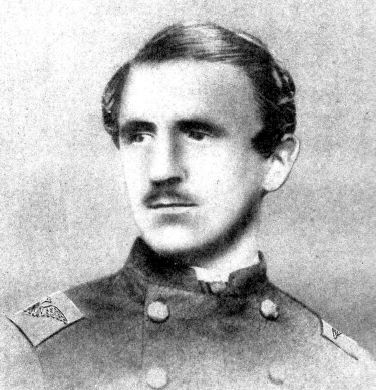
Col James M. Schoonmaker

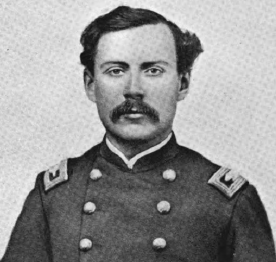
Col John H. Oley

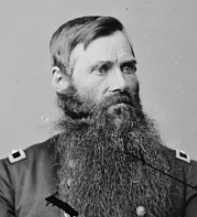
Col Thomas M. Harris

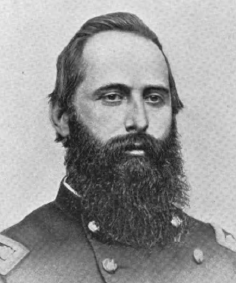
Ltc Francis W. Thompson

== Confederate Department of Western Virginia and Tennessee ==
BG John Echols

Maj George McKendree, brigade quartermaster
Cpt R. H. Catlett, staff
Cpt W. R. Preston, staff

Echols' Brigade numbered about 1,558 only seven days before the Battle of Droop Mountain, and he claimed he had no more than 1,700 men directly under his command.

Echols' Brigade	Regiments and Others
Col George S. Patton Sr. (22nd Virginia Infantry)	22nd Virginia Infantry Regiment: Maj Robert A. "Gus" Bailey (k); 23rd Virginia Infantry Battalion: Maj William Blessing; 26th Virginia Infantry Battalion: Ltc George M. Edgar; Virginia Light Artillery, Chapman's Company: Cpt George B. Chapman; Additional Information: A portion of the 22nd Virginia Infantry's Company D was detached, leaving the main body with 550 men.; The 22nd Virginia Infantry was originally known as the 1st Kanawha Regiment, which evolved from the Kanawha Riflemen.; The 23rd Virginia Infantry Battalion was also known as the 1st Battalion and as Derrick's Battalion.; The 23rd Virginia Infantry Battalion had an estimated 200 to 350 men at Droop Mountain.; The 26th Virginia Infantry Battalion was originally known as Edgar's Battalion.; The 26th Virginia Infantry Battalion's Company I was detached at Dublin Depot.; The 26th Virginia Infantry Battalion's 400 men were detached to protect a road about 12 miles (19 km) from Droop Mountain and did not engage.; Chapman's battery had roughly 120 men and four guns, but one was detached with the 26th Virginia Battalion.; At Droop Mountain, Chapman's battery and Jackson's battery were under the command of Major William L. McLaughlin.

Jackson's Brigade	Regiments and Others
Col William L. "Mudwall" Jackson (19th Virginia Cavalry)	19th Virginia Cavalry Regiment: Ltc William P. Thompson; 20th Virginia Cavalry Regiment: Col William Wiley Arnett; Kessler's Battalion: Maj Joseph R. Kessler (19th Virginia Cavalry); Four independent cavalry companies; Lurty's Battery, (Roanoke) Virginia Horse Artillery: Cpt Warren S. Lurty; Additional Information: A squadron of 300-400 men from the 19th Virginia Cavalry became cutoff from Jackson's main force and did not participate in the battle.; Total effectives at Droop Mountain for Jackson's Brigade was 750.; Kessler's Battalion, with the addition of two more companies, became the 46th Battalion Virginia Cavalry in early 1864.; Lurty's Battery was mounted and rode with the cavalry. Its guns were two 12-pounder howitzers.

Ferguson's (Jenkins') Brigade	Regiments and Others
Col Milton Jameson Ferguson (16th Virginia Cavalry)	14th Virginia Cavalry Regiment: Col James A. Cochrane, Maj Benjamin F. Eakle; 16th Virginia Cavalry Regiment: Maj James H. Nounnan; Jackson's Battery Virginia Horse Artillery: Cpt Thomas E. Jackson; Additional Information: Brigade commander BG Albert G. Jenkins had been wounded on July 2 at the Battle of Gettysburg, leaving Ferguson in charge of the brigade.; Six companies of the 14th Virginia Cavalry were at Droop Mountain. The remainder remained upon picket duty near Lewisburg, covering the road from Nicholas County.; The 16th Virginia Cavalry was not at Droop Mountain because it was guarding the western approaches to Lewisburg.; Captain Jackson's Battery had two guns. One was a 10-pounder Parrott, and the other was a 3-inch rifle. The two guns were the only long-range guns available to Echols.

Principal Confederate commanders
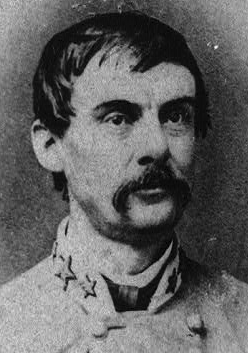
BG John Echols

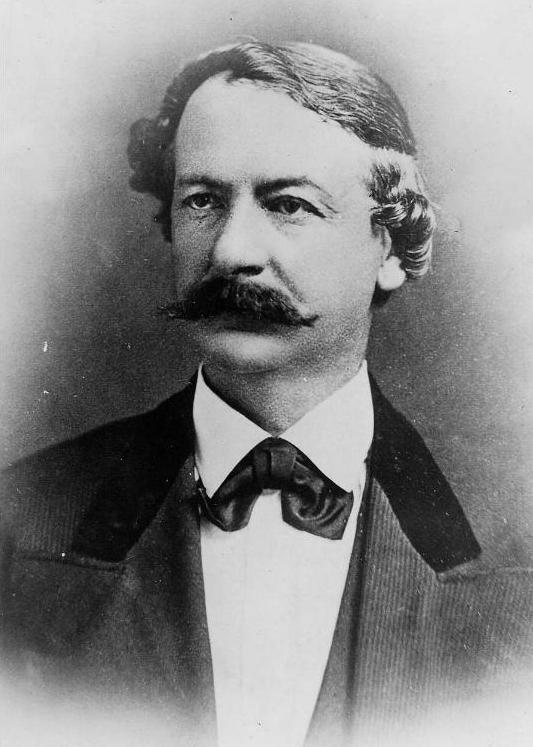
Col William L. "Mudwall" Jackson

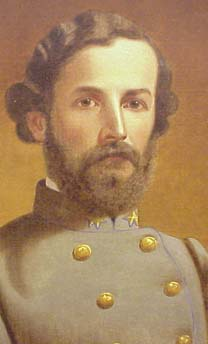
Col George S. Patton

== Notes ==
=== References ===
- Lowry, Terry (1996). Last Sleep: The Battle of Droop Mountain, November 6, 1863. Charleston, West Virginia: Pictorial Histories Publishing Company. ISBN 978-1-57510-024-1. OCLC 36488613.
- Scott, Robert N. (1890). The War of the Rebellion: a Compilation of the Official Records of the Union and Confederate Armies - Series I Volume XXIX Part I - Reports, Chapter XLI. Washington, District of Columbia: Government Printing Office. ISBN 978-1-57510-024-1. OCLC 36488613.
