= 3rd West Virginia Infantry Regiment =

Infantry Regiment in the American Civil War 1861–1864

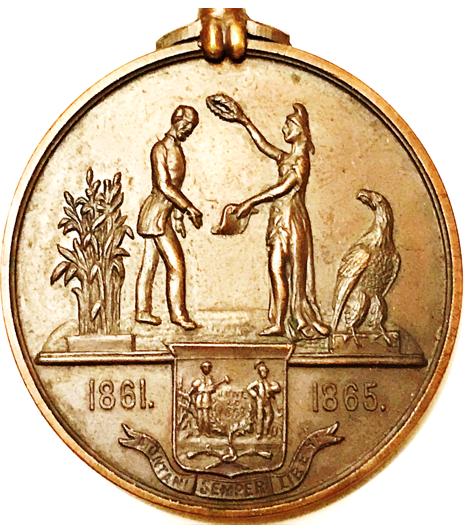
- West Virginia honorable discharge medal
- Active: June 1861 to January 26, 1864
- Country: United States
- Allegiance: Union
- Branch: Infantry
- Engagements: American Civil War 1862: Battle of McDowell, Battle of Cross Keys, Battle of Groveton, Second Battle of Bull Run 1863: Battle of White Sulphur Springs, Battle of Droop Mountain

Commanders
- Colonel: David Hewes 1861–1863
- Lt. Colonel: Francis Thompson 1863–1864

The 3rd West Virginia Infantry Regiment was an infantry regiment that served in the Union Army during the American Civil War. Most of its members were recruited in counties from the northern portion of what is now West Virginia. The regiment was known as the 3rd Virginia Infantry prior to the creation of the state of West Virginia, and should not be confused with the 3rd Virginia Infantry Regiment that belonged to the Confederate States Army.

The regiment conducted all of its fighting in Virginia and West Virginia. Its commander in the field was almost always Lieutenant Colonel Francis W. Thompson. Until the spring of 1863, it usually fought as part of a brigade commanded by Brigadier General Robert H. Milroy. During May and June 1863, the regiment was converted to a mounted infantry by Brigadier General William W. Averell. During 1863 the mounted regiment was part of two of Averell's raids intended to damage the Confederate Virginia and Tennessee Railroad. The major battles that were part of these raids were the Battle of White Sulphur Springs and the Battle of Droop Mountain.

On January 26, 1864, the regiment was reorganized as the 6th West Virginia Cavalry Regiment. On the same day, the 2nd West Virginia Infantry Regiment, which had been a mounted infantry and was often part of the same infantry brigade, was reorganized as the 5th West Virginia Cavalry Regiment. On December 14, 1864, the remaining battalion of the 5th West Virginia Cavalry was absorbed by the 6th West Virginia Cavalry.

== Background and organization ==
=== Background ===
Fighting in the American Civil War began on April 12, 1861. The state (or commonwealth) of Virginia seceded from the United States on April 17, 1861, and joined seven southern states (three additional states seceded later) in the Confederate States of America. In the western portion of Virginia, many people (especially the non-slaveholders in the mountainous regions) preferred to remain loyal to the United States (a.k.a. the Union). Others from this region remained loyal to Virginia and fought for the Confederacy. Virginians loyal to the United States approved pursuing their own statehood on October 24, 1861, and the western portion of Virginia officially became the state of West Virginia on June 20, 1863.

During the Civil War and prior to the creation of West Virginia, the Confederacy had a 3rd Virginia Infantry Regiment, as did the Union. Reports from Union officers made early in the war sometimes referred to the loyal Union regiments as Virginia regiments. To avoid confusion, authors typically call the pro-Union Virginia regiments "West Virginia" regiments. Adding to the potential confusion for the Union's 3rd West Virginia Infantry Regiment, it became a mounted infantry regiment in 1863, and became the 6th West Virginia Cavalry Regiment in 1864.

=== Organization ===
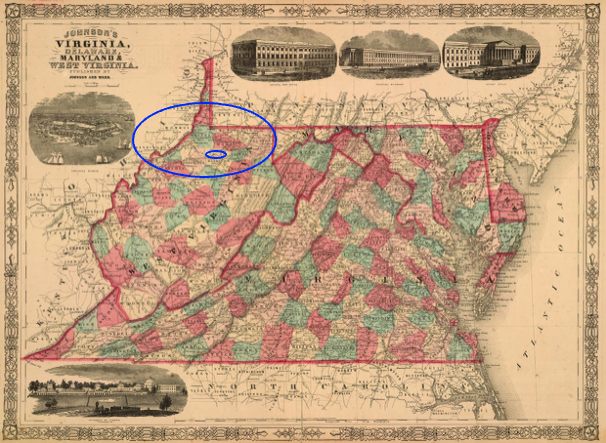
3rd West Virginia recruitment area

The 3rd West Virginia Infantry Regiment was organized during June and July 1861. Local newspapers called the regiment "3rd Regiment, Virginia Volunteers" or "Third Virginia Regiment". The regiment was organized by David T. Hewes of Clarksburg, Virginia, and he was its original colonel. Hewes had been involved with the state militia and was known as a good drill–master. Francis W. Thompson was the original lieutenant colonel. He had been a captain during the 1850s in the Yakima War. Thompson recruited Company A and was its captain, but was promoted to lieutenant colonel only a few weeks later. Charles E. Swearingen was the original major. Future congressman and lawyer Richard W. Blue began as a private in the regiment, and eventually became a lieutenant.

The regiment was organized at Clarksburg (Harrison County), Wheeling (Ohio County), and Newburg (Preston County) in the portion of northwestern Virginia that is now the northern part of West Virginia. Company A was recruited in Monongalia County; Company B in Harrison County; Companies C and D in Preston County; and Company E in Upshur County. Company F was recruited in Taylor and Harrison Counties; Company G in Harrison County; Company H in Monongalia County and from the Pennsylvania border; Company I in Marshall County; and Company K in Ritchie County. Soldiers were armed with Springfield muskets that had been "altered from the old flint–lock".

== Service as infantry ==
The regiment began service unattached, and protected border counties from Phillippi to Suttonville until September 1861. It was stationed in Beverly beginning September 10 and then moved to Elkwater until April 1862. The regiment's 439 soldiers became part of an independent brigade commanded by Brigadier General Robert H. Milroy. The brigade was part of the Mountain Department, which was led by Major General John C. Frémont.

=== Frémont and the Mountain Department ===
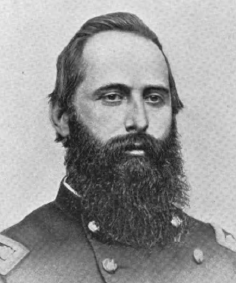
Ltc. Thompson

The 3rd West Virginia Infantry Regiment fought at the Battle of McDowell on May 8, 1862, as part of Milroy's Independent Brigade. Union forces were defeated by an army commanded by Major General Thomas J. “Stonewall” Jackson. In this battle, the regiment's Colonel Hewes left the regiment, without notifying his second–in–command, as the regiment advanced to attack the enemy. He did not return until the battle was over. Lieutenant Colonel Thompson led the regiment, and he was among those praised for "their steady gallantry and courage".

During the battle, the regiment attempted to turn the right flank of the enemy. It became exposed to firing at its front and rear. The engagement continued after dark until ammunition was almost depleted, and then the Union forces were recalled. Casualties for the regiment were four killed, nine wounded severely, and 33 wounded slightly. The regiment was said to have received "the most severe fire of the enemy".

Colonel Hewes went on leave beginning June 4, 1862, and his leave ended on July 25, 1862 after he got an extension. While he was on leave, the regiment continued to be part of Milroy's Brigade, and fought in the June 8 Battle of Cross Keys. Milroy's Brigade consisted of the 2nd, 3rd, and 5th West Virginia Infantry regiments; plus the 25th Ohio Infantry, a detachment of the 1st West Virginia Cavalry, and three light artillery batteries. Casualties for the regiment were four killed and 23 wounded.

=== Pope and the Army of Virginia ===
On June 26, 1862, Major General John Pope became commander of the newly organized Union Army of Virginia. The regiment continued as part of Milroy's Independent Brigade, only now it was part of the 1st Army Corps in Pope's Army of Virginia. Hewes did not report back to his unit until September 15, which meant that he missed the entire Northern Virginia campaign and was absent without leave for about 50 days. The regiment is listed as participating in the August 9 defeat at the Battle of Cedar Mountain, but the entire 1st Army Corps (including the 3rd West Virginia Infantry) is not listed in the casualties report.

For the period of August 16 through September 2, Major General Franz Sigel commanded Pope's First Army Corps, which included Milroy's Independent Brigade. Casualties for the regiment during the period were eight killed, 31 wounded, and 32 missing or captured. This totaled to 71 casualties of the brigade's 437. The 2nd West Virginia Infantry was also part of this brigade. Fighting included the First Battle of Rappahannock Station (a.k.a. Waterloo Bridge) on August 23–25, and Second Battle of Bull Run (a.k.a. Gainesville) on August 28. In the Second Battle of Bull Run, Lieutenant Colonel Thompson was badly wounded, but refused to leave the field. He eventually fell off his horse due the loss of blood, and did not return to duty until the spring of 1863.

=== Detachments ===
After the Union defeat at Bull Run, the regiment went into camp near Washington, D.C. at Fort Ethan Allen. The regiment left camp on September 30 and moved to Clarksburg, West Virginia. There it was split into detachments and guarded West Virginia towns such as Buckhannon, Bull Town, Centerville, Glenville, and Sutton.

=== Changes in command ===
A General Court Martial of Colonel David T. Hewes convened on March 10, 1863. Hewes was found guilty on two of four charges, and he was sentenced to be dismissed from the army. After approval by the proper authorities, Hewes was dismissed from the army effective February 15, 1864.

On May 18, 1863, Brigadier General William W. Averell became commander of the 4th Separate Brigade with headquarters in Weston, West Virginia. The various detachments and battalions of the 3rd West Virginia Infantry Regiment were reunited into this brigade. Averell decided to mount portions of his brigade, and the 3rd West Virginia Infantry was sent to a camp for instruction and drilling on June 6. Horses were issued, but the related equipment did not arrive until June 15. (Note: Another source says the regiment was mounted May 5, 1863.)

== Service as mounted infantry ==
By the summer of 1863, the regiment became known as the 3rd West Virginia Mounted Infantry. It participated in two major battles as part of Averell's 4th Separate Brigade; the Battle of White Sulphur Springs and the Battle of Droop Mountain.

=== White Sulphur Springs ===
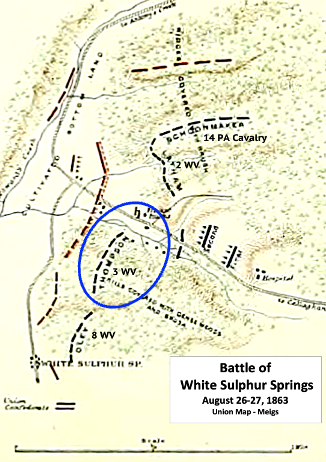
3rd WV Mounted Infantry circled on map

Averell, headquartered near Moorefield, West Virginia, received orders dated August 12 to go to Lewisburg, West Virginia, and eliminate any enemy force stationed there. While there, he was to take possession of the law books in the law library of the Virginia Supreme Court of Appeals located in the town, and bring the books to the Union fortification in Beverly, West Virginia. Targets enroute included a Confederate regiment headquartered in Huntersville and a saltpeter and gunpowder works.

Averell's brigade used a deceptive approach to Lewisburg, and Confederate Army leadership became concerned about the safety of two important railroads: the Virginia Central and the Virginia & Tennessee. The Confederate Army intercepted Averell near White Sulphur Springs as his brigade got close to Lewisburg. The Confederates were strongly entrenched and because of the terrain, it was difficult to flank them. Fighting began during the morning of August 26.

Lieutenant Colonel Thompson commanded the 3rd West Virginia, and one of their early positions was on the Union left with most of Thompson's soldiers on the left side of the main road. Thompson led his regiment in no less than seven charges, but none of the Union regiments could push back the Confederate soldiers.

Averell ordered a retreat during the morning of August 27. His casualties were 26 killed, 125 wounded, and 67 missing or captured. The 3rd West Virginia (Mounted) Infantry's portion of the casualties was five soldiers killed, 29 wounded, and five captured or missing. The Battle of White Sulphur Springs is also known as the Battle of Dry Creek or the Battle of Rocky Gap.

=== Droop Mountain ===
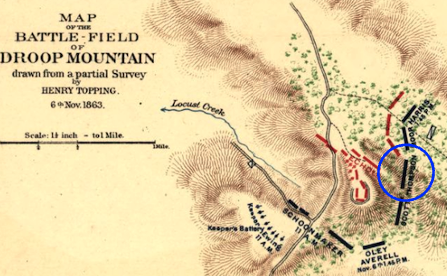
3rd WV Mounted Infantry, led by Ltc. Thompson, circled on map

On October 26, 1863, Brigadier General Benjamin Franklin Kelley, commander of the Department of West Virginia, ordered Averell to move his command south from Beverly, West Virginia, and attack a Confederate force stationed near Lewisburg in Greenbrier County, West Virginia. After that portion of the raid was completed, he was to attack the Virginia and Tennessee Railroad near Dublin Station, including the bridge over the New River.

On November 5, the Confederate Army occupied the crest of Droop Mountain, about 30 miles (48 km) north of Lewisburg. This blocked the main road to Lewisville. During the next morning, Averell sent a brigade of infantry (1,175 soldiers) commanded by Colonel Augustus Moor to the far right to flank the Confederate left. While the flanking movement was being made, the 14th Pennsylvania Cavalry Regiment, with artillery and commanded by Colonel James M. Schoonmaker, made a demonstration against the Confederate right and center that would distract attention from the flanking movement. Once the flanking movement was in place, the Confederate left and center were attacked by the 2nd West Virginia, 3rd West Virginia, and 8th Ohio regiments.

The attack by the three-regiment force near the center was made while dismounted, and the Union soldiers advanced up the steep mountainside while under artillery fire. Lieutenant Colonel Thompson led at least one charge by the 3rd West Virginia at the top of the mountain. By 4:00 pm the battle was over and the Confederates fled south. Averell's command had 119 casualties in the battle. Included in that total are 11 casualties for the 3rd West Virginia Mounted Infantry: six killed and five wounded. One of the wounded was mortally wounded—Captain Jacob G. Coburn.

== End of service as mounted infantry ==
The regiment went on Averell's Salem Raid during December 1863. Averell's force consisted of four regiments, one battalion, and an artillery battery. This was another raid with an objective of destroying infrastructure belonging to the Virginia and Tennessee Railroad. Averell's December 21 report said that his command moved 355 miles (571 km) since December 8. The 3rd West Virginia Mounted Infantry had one soldier wounded near Franklin, Virginia. In addition, one corporal and 16 privates were captured near Covington, Virginia, on December 19.

The mounted regiment was converted to a cavalry unit named 6th West Virginia Cavalry Regiment on January 26, 1864. At the same time, the 2nd West Virginia Mounted Infantry was converted to the 5th West Virginia Cavalry Regiment. Because of the expiration of many of the soldier's three-year enlistments, the 5th West Virginia Cavalry Regiment was consolidated to a battalion during September 1864. Effective December 14, that battalion was combined into the 6th West Virginia Cavalry Regiment.

== Notes ==
=== References ===
- Averell, William W. (1902). "Reports of Brig. Gen. William W. Averell...August 5–31". In Ainsworth, Fred C.; Kirkley, Joseph W. (eds.). The War of the Rebellion: a Compilation of the Official Records of the Union and Confederate Armies Series I Volume XXIX Additions and Corrections. Washington, DC: Government Printing Office. pp. 32–40. OCLC 318422190.
- Averell, William W. (1902a). "Reports of Brig. Gen. William W. Averell...commanding expedition to Virginia and Tennessee Railroad". In Ainsworth, Fred C.; Kirkley, Joseph W. (eds.). The War of the Rebellion: a Compilation of the Official Records of the Union and Confederate Armies Series I Volume XXIX Additions and Corrections. Washington, DC: Government Printing Office. pp. 924–933. OCLC 318422190.
- Dyer, Frederick H. (1908). A Compendium of the War of the Rebellion. Des Moines, Iowa: Dyer Pub. Co. OCLC 1028851810.
- Egan, Michael (1888). The Flying, Gray-haired Yank, or, The Adventures of a Volunteer: a True Narrative of the Civil War. Philadelphia, Pennsylvania: Hubbard Brothers. LCCN 02017757.
- Frémont, John C. (1902). "Reports of Maj. Gen. John C. Frémont....". In Ainsworth, Fred C.; Kirkley, Joseph W. (eds.). The War of the Rebellion: a Compilation of the Official Records of the Union and Confederate Armies Series I Volume XII - Additions and Corrections. Washington, DC: Government Printing Office. pp. 460–462. OCLC 318422190.
- Kelley, Benjamin F. (1902). "Report of Brig. Gen. Benjamin F. Kelley....". In Ainsworth, Fred C.; Kirkley, Joseph W. (eds.). The War of the Rebellion: a Compilation of the Official Records of the Union and Confederate Armies Series I Volume XXIX Additions and Corrections. Washington, DC: Government Printing Office. pp. 499–502. OCLC 318422190.
- Lang, Joseph J. (1895). Loyal West Virginia from 1861 to 1865 : With an Introductory Chapter on the Status of Virginia for Thirty Years Prior to the War. Baltimore, MD: Deutsch Publishing Co. OCLC 779093.
- Lowry, Terry (1996). Last Sleep: The Battle of Droop Mountain, November 6, 1863. Charleston, West Virginia: Pictorial Histories Publishing Company. ISBN 978-1-57510-024-1. OCLC 36488613.
- MacCorkle, William Alexander (1916). The White Sulphur Springs; the Traditions, History, and Social Life of the Greenbriar White Sulphur Springs. Charleston, West Virginia: W.A. MacCorkle. OCLC 11083303.
- Milroy, Robert C. (1902). "Report of Brig. Gen. Robert H. Milroy....". In Ainsworth, Fred C.; Kirkley, Joseph W. (eds.). The War of the Rebellion: a Compilation of the Official Records of the Union and Confederate Armies Series I Volume XII - Additions and Corrections. Washington, DC: Government Printing Office. pp. 465–467. OCLC 318422190.
- Schenck, Robert C. (1902). "Report of Brig. Gen. Robert C. Schenck....". In Ainsworth, Fred C.; Kirkley, Joseph W. (eds.). The War of the Rebellion: a Compilation of the Official Records of the Union and Confederate Armies Series I Volume XII - Additions and Corrections. Washington, DC: Government Printing Office. pp. 462–465. OCLC 318422190. Archived from the original on August 10, 2025.
- Starr, Stephen Z. (2007). The Union Cavalry in the Civil War - Vol. II - The War in the East, from Gettysburg to Appomattox. Baton Rouge, Louisiana: Louisiana State University Press. OCLC 4492585.
- (Unlisted) (1885). "Return of Casualties ...battle of Cedar Mountain". In Scott, Robert N. (ed.). The War of the Rebellion: a Compilation of the Official Records of the Union and Confederate Armies Series I Volume XII - Part II - Reports. Washington, DC: Government Printing Office. pp. 136–139. OCLC 318422190.
- (Unlisted) (1885a). "Return of Casualties ...August 16–September 2, 1862 inclusive". In Scott, Robert N. (ed.). The War of the Rebellion: a Compilation of the Official Records of the Union and Confederate Armies Series I Volume XII - Part II - Reports. Washington, DC: Government Printing Office. pp. 249–262. OCLC 318422190.
- (Unlisted) (1902). "Return of Casualties in the Union forces at the battle of Cross Keys". In Ainsworth, Fred C.; Kirkley, Joseph W. (eds.). The War of the Rebellion: a Compilation of the Official Records of the Union and Confederate Armies Series I Volume XII - Additions and Corrections. Washington, DC: Government Printing Office. pp. 664–665. OCLC 318422190.
- (Unlisted) (1902a). "Return of Casualties in the Union forces engaged at Rock Gap, near White Sulphur Springs....". In Scott, Robert N. (ed.). The War of the Rebellion: a Compilation of the Official Records of the Union and Confederate Armies Series I Volume XXIX Additions and Corrections. Washington, DC: Government Printing Office. p. 41. OCLC 318422190.
- (Unlisted) (1902b). "Return of Casualties in the Union forces engaged at Droop Mountain....". In Ainsworth, Fred C.; Kirkley, Joseph W. (eds.). The War of the Rebellion: a Compilation of the Official Records of the Union and Confederate Armies Series I Volume XXIX Additions and Corrections. Washington, DC: Government Printing Office. p. 503. OCLC 318422190.
- United States; Adjutant General's Office (1865). "General Orders, No. 82". General Orders 1864. Washington, District of Columbia: Government Printing Office: 1–5.
- Wittenberg, Eric J. (2011). The Battle of White Sulphur Springs: Averell Fails to Secure West Virginia. Charleston, South Carolina: History Press. ISBN 978-1-61423-326-8. OCLC 795566215.

== See also ==
- Medals of Honor for West Virginia Soldiers
- West Virginia Units in the Civil War
- West Virginia in the Civil War
