= 4th West Virginia Infantry Regiment =

American Civil War Union Army unit

- Flag of West Virginia
- Active: June 17, 1861, to December 21, 1864
- Country: (United States) United States; Union
- Allegiance: West Virginia
- Branch: Infantry
- Engagements: Battle of Fayetteville; Battle of Charleston; Siege of Vicksburg; Battle of Jackson; Battle of Missionary Ridge

Commanders
- Colonel: Joseph A.J. Lightburn 1861–62
- Lt. Colonel: William H.H. Russell
- Colonel: James H. Dayton 1862-65

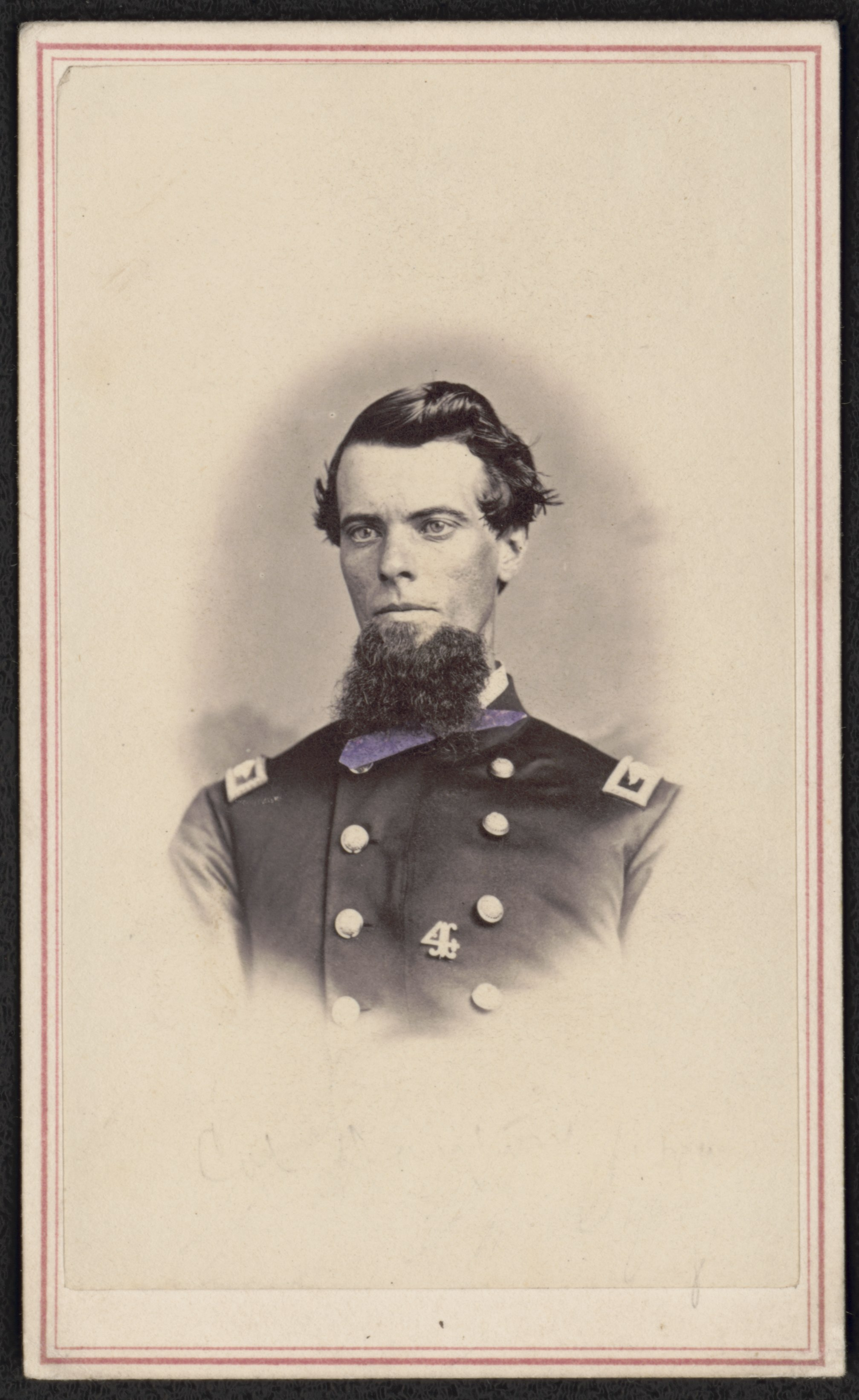
Colonel James H. Dayton of Co. K, 4th West Virginia Infantry Regiment

The 4th West Virginia Infantry Regiment was an infantry regiment that served in the Union Army during the American Civil War.

== Service ==
The 4th West Virginia Infantry Regiment was mustered into Federal service on June 17, 1861, at Grafton, Point Pleasant, and Mason City, Virginia. It was recruited primarily in Ohio from the counties of Meigs, Gallia, Lawrence and Athens, which contributed seven full companies. Among its early recruits was future United States Congressman John L. Vance, who would rise to the rank of lieutenant colonel. The regiment fought in the Kanawha Valley Campaign of 1862 as part of a brigade commanded by Colonel Samuel A. Gilbert.

Toward the end of the war, the regiment's re-enlisting veterans were consolidated with the 1st West Virginia Infantry Regiment (3 Year) on December 21, 1864, to form the 2nd West Virginia Veteran Infantry Regiment.

== Casualties ==
The 4th West Virginia Infantry Regiment suffered 3 officers and 80 enlisted men killed or fatally wounded in battle and 2 officers and 156 enlisted men dead from disease, a total of 241 fatalities.

== Colonels ==
- Colonel James H. Dayton

== Notable members ==
- Sergeant John C. Buckley, Company G, — Participating in a diversionary "forlorn hope" attack on Confederate defenses, 22 May 1863.
- Sergeant William Bumgarner, Company A, — Participating in the same "forlorn hope."
- Private Jasper N. North, Company D, — Participating in the same "forlorn hope."
- Private James Calvin Summers, Company H, — Participating in the same "forlorn hope."
- Captain William R. Brown, Company E, — Appointed Colonel of the 13th West Virginia Infantry Regiment in 1862
- Private William H. Barringer, Company F, Medal of Honor for “Gallantry in the charge of the volunteer storming party”, Siege of Vicksburg. (CMOHS 2023)
- Major Arza Goodspeed — The state memorial for West Virginia at Vicksburg, Miss., representing the 4th West Virginia Infantry commemorates Major Goodspeed, who died in action on that battlefield. The memorial Is located on Union Avenue south of Graveyard Road.

== See also ==
- List of West Virginia Civil War Union units
- West Virginia in the Civil War
