= William Bumgarner =

United States Army Medal of Honor recipient (1837–1911)

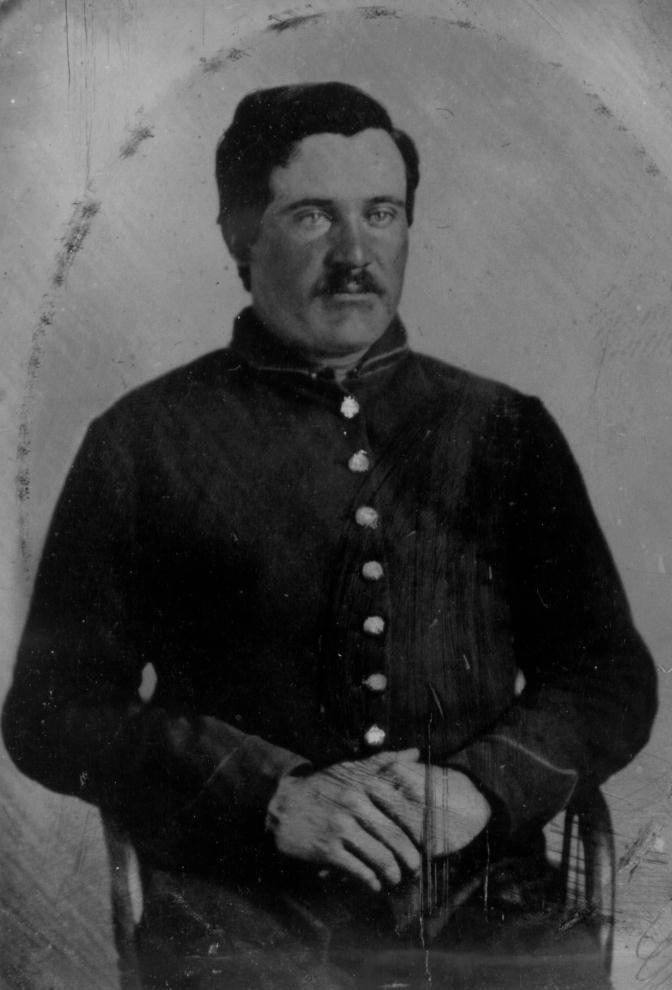
- Born: July 12, 1837; Mason County, West Virginia, US
- Died: December 24, 1911 (aged 74); Indiana, US
- Burial place: Mossburg Cemetery
- Military career
- Allegiance: United States of America
- Branch: United States Army
- Rank: Sergeant
- Unit: 4th Regiment West Virginia Volunteer Infantry - Company A,
- Awards: Medal of Honor

Sergeant William Bumgarner (July 12, 1837 – December 24, 1911) was an American soldier who fought in the American Civil War. Bumgarner received the country's highest award for bravery during combat, the Medal of Honor, for his action at the siege of Vicksburg on 22 May 1863. He was honored with the award on 10 July 1894.

== Biography ==
Bumgarner was born in Mason County, West Virginia on 12 July 1837. He enlisted into the 4th West Virginia Infantry. He died on 24 December 1911, and his remains are interred at the Mossburg Cemetery in Indiana.

== Medal of Honor citation ==
Gallantry in the charge of the volunteer storming party.

== See also ==
- List of American Civil War Medal of Honor recipients: A–F
- Battle of Vicksburg
- 4th West Virginia Volunteer Infantry Regiment
