= 2nd West Virginia Veteran Infantry Regiment =

- Flag of West Virginia
- Active: December 10, 1864, to July 16, 1865
- Country: United States
- Allegiance: Union
- Branch: Infantry
- Engagements: None

The 2nd West Virginia Veteran Infantry Regiment was an infantry regiment that served in the Union Army during the American Civil War.

== Service ==
The 2nd West Virginia Veteran Infantry Regiment was created by the amalgamation of the 1st West Virginia Infantry Regiment (3 Year) and the 4th West Virginia Infantry Regiment on December 10, 1864.

The regiment would primarily conduct duty at Cumberland, Maryland, and at Bulltown, West Virginia until they were mustered out.

It mustered out of service on July 16, 1865.

== Casualties ==
The 2nd West Virginia Veteran Infantry Regiment suffered one enlisted man killed or mortally wounded in battle and 16 enlisted men dead from disease for a total of 17 fatalities.

== See also ==
- West Virginia Units in the Civil War
- West Virginia in the Civil War
