= 5th West Virginia Cavalry Regiment =

United States Civil War military unit

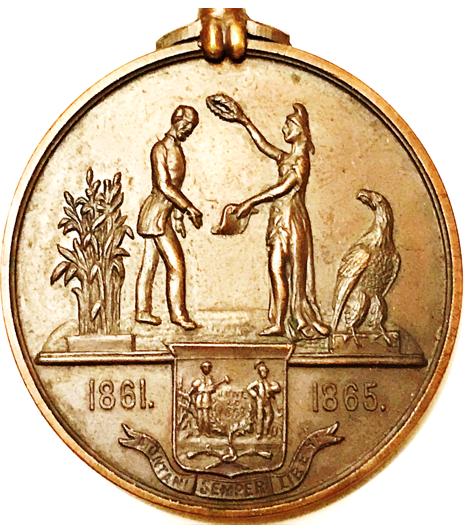
- West Virginia honorable discharge medal
- Active: January 26, 1864, to December 14, 1864
- Country: United States
- Allegiance: Union
- Branch: Union Army
- Type: Cavalry
- Engagements: American Civil War: Battle of Cloyd's Mountain; Battle of Lynchburg

Commanders
- Colonel: George R. Latham

The 5th West Virginia Cavalry Regiment was a cavalry regiment that served in the Union Army in 1864 during the American Civil War. It was originally organized as the 2nd (West) Virginia Infantry regiment during 1861, and spent the last half of 1863 as a mounted infantry before being reorganized as a cavalry regiment. Because of the expiration of many of its members' three–year terms of service, it was absorbed by the 6th West Virginia Cavalry Regiment during December 1864.

== Organization ==
The 5th West Virginia Cavalry Regiment was organized from the Union Army's 2nd West Virginia Mounted Infantry Regiment on January 26, 1864. It consisted of soldiers from Pennsylvania, Ohio, and West Virginia, who had already fought as mounted infantry at battles such as White Sulphur Springs (a.k.a. Rocky Gap) and Droop Mountain. George R. Latham was the regiment's colonel. Alexander Scott was the lieutenant colonel.

The regiment spent winter camp in Martinsburg, West Virginia, where most of its assignments were picket duty and scouting in Hampshire and Hardy counties. On March 19, 1864, it began moving through Maryland and Virginia, arriving at Charleston, West Virginia, on April 30. Captain Douglas D. Barclay, of Company D, was promoted to major on May 1, 1864, with a commission date of April 25, 1864.

== Service ==
During March 1864, Lieutenant General Ulysses S. Grant became commander of the entire Union Army. Grant's strategy in Virginia was to attack the strongest Confederate Army, Robert E. Lee's Army of Northern Virginia, from multiple fronts. In western Virginia, the railroads that supplied Lee's army were Union targets, including the Virginia & Tennessee Railroad and the Virginia Central Railroad. Attacking the railroads would cause Lee to send troops west to protect vital railroad infrastructure, resulting in fewer soldiers available to protect the Confederate capital in Richmond. In late March 1864, Grant met with Brigadier General George Crook to confirm his desire to attack the Virginia & Tennessee Railroad, including its bridge over the New River. Railroad infrastructure was to be damaged at multiple points. At the same time, another Union force would attack the Virginia Central Railroad. Afterwards, the two forces would unite at Staunton, Virginia, and advance to Lynchburg.

=== Crook's expedition to the Virginia & Tennessee Railroad ===
Crook commanded the 2nd Infantry Division, and was headquartered in West Virginia's Kanawha River Valley at Charleston, West Virginia. During April, while preparing for the raid on the railroad, Crook was joined by Brigadier General William W. Averell's cavalry division. The division included two brigades, plus 400 soldiers from the 5th and 7th West Virginia cavalries under the command of Colonel John H. Oley. (Note: One source calls the 400-soldier force a "brigade commanded by Colonel Oley".) Like the 5th West Virginia, the 7th West Virginia had been an infantry regiment (8th West Virginia), and its commander was Colonel Oley.

Crook's plan was to have Averell lead cavalry in an attack on the salt mines served by the Virginia & Tennessee Railroad, while Crook would lead a large infantry force in an attack further east at the railroad bridge. The two Union forces were moving toward their objectives by May 2. As a diversion, Crook had a third force, Blazer's Scouts and the 5th West Virginia Infantry Regiment, move toward the Confederate town of Lewisburg, West Virginia. While Averell moved toward his objective, Oley's cavalry force was sent away to unite with Crook's infantry force. On May 8, they united at the intersection of the Princeton and Dublin roads, which was about 10 miles (16 km) from the Dublin Depot on the Virginia & Tennessee Railroad.

==== Crook's army begins fighting ====
Crook discovered that the Confederate Army was concentrating 6 miles (9.7 km) north of Dublin at Cloyd's Mountain, and fighting began on May 9. The 5th West Virginia Cavalry began the battle protecting the rear and guarding the wagon train, and was located two or three miles (4.8 km) behind the main force. When the "first gun" was fired, a detachment of the rear guard rode forward to protect Crook's artillery. The detachment was commanded by Major Barclay of the 5th West Virginia Cavalry, and it was deployed dismounted on the ground in front of the artillery. The detachment waited on the ground, with the Union artillery shooting over it, while Confederate artillery returned fired from a breastworks. About one hour later, Crook's flanking force attacked the Confederate breastworks. After some "furious" fighting, the breastworks was captured and the cavalry was remounted to chase the fleeing Confederate soldiers.

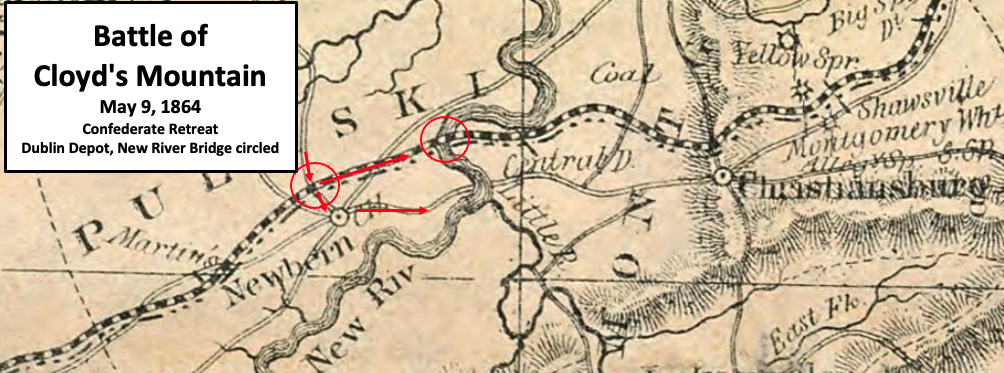
The Confederate Army retreated to the east side of the railroad bridge

Although the 5th West Virginia Cavalry was officially a cavalry, it was still essentially a mounted infantry. The riders did not have sabers, which could have been useful in the pursuit of the fleeing enemy. A portion of cavalry was ambushed by Confederate troops from Kentucky. The Kentucky troops had arrived by rail too late for the battle, but assisted in the Confederate retreat. Their delaying action enabled the evacuation of Confederate troops, along with some of the supplies located at the Dublin Depot. The Confederate troops retreated to the far side of the railroad bridge on the New River.

On the next day, an artillery duel took place at the New River bridge. Crook's troops were on the west side of the bridge, and Confederate troops on the east side. Fearing being caught between the river/bridge and a flank attack, the Confederate troops resumed their retreat east. Crook's troops burned the bridge and moved on. (Note: Repairs to the bridge began on May 16, and by June 11 it was ready to use.) Historian Richard R. Duncan calls Crook and Averell's May 1864 attacks on the Virginia & Tennessee Railroad "the Dublin Raid". The Report of Casualties in the Official Records of the Union and Confederate Armies calls the main battle "the engagement at Cloyd's Mountain", and includes casualties at Jeffersonville (May 8) and the New River Bridge (May 10). The report lists 688 casualties for Crook's entire force. The 5th West Virginia Cavalry, and the 7th West Virginia Cavalry, are listed as dismounted detachments under the direct supervision of the 36th Ohio Infantry Regiment. The report lists the two detachments with no casualties, and does not say if the 21 casualties for the 36th Ohio Infantry includes the two detachments. (Note: Although the Official Record does not list any casualties for the 5th West Virginia Cavalry, the regimental historian says that during the pursuit, the Confederates "poured a heavy volley into us, wounding our chaplain..." and "a number of men". He also mentions an ambush during the pursuit where the regiment retreated along with "many riderless horses".)

=== Hunter's expedition to Lynchburg ===
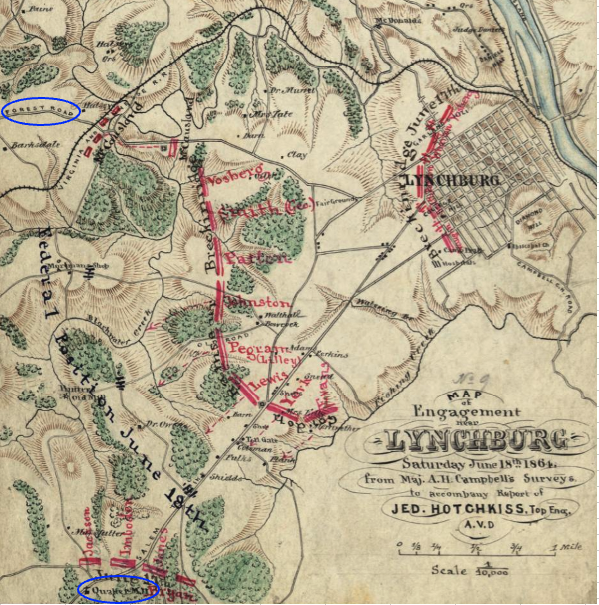
Quaker Meetinghouse was southwest of Lynchburg

On May 27, a portion of the regiment had completed its term of enlistment, so those soldiers left camp to be mustered out. The remaining portion of the regiment, commanded by Lieutenant Colonel Scott, began moving with Averell and Crook to unite with more Union troops in Staunton, Virginia. In Staunton, Major General David Hunter, commander of the Union Army of the Shenandoah, reorganized his cavalry into two divisions. The 5th West Virginia served in the 2nd Brigade of the 2nd Cavalry Division. Averell commanded the division, while Oley commanded the brigade.

About four miles (6.4 km) from Lynchburg, near a Quaker meetinghouse, Averell's division fought Confederate cavalry on June 17. The Union soldiers had to cross an open field to get to Confederate cavalry protected by cover. Oley's brigade was positioned on the right of the attacking Union force. After an artillery strike by the Confederates, Oley's brigade fought dismounted. The Union force was repulsed until it was reinforced by infantry. After driving the Confederate cavalry back for about one mile (1.6 km), Hunter paused the attack because of approaching darkness.

For the attack on the next day, Averell's cavalry was held in reserve. Confederate prisoners, captured in the day's fighting, claimed that Confederate reinforcements were arriving in Lynchburg. The arrival of trains and the cheering of local citizens could be heard in the late afternoon, and this added credibility to their claims. Fearing a Confederate force larger than his army, and being low on supplies, Hunter prepared to withdraw. Late in the afternoon, the decision was made to retreat. Losses for the 5th West Virginia Cavalry, which include the expedition to Lynchburg and the retreat (June 10–June 23), were one wounded and two missing or captured.

== End of service ==
After returning to Union held territory following the Lynchburg expedition, the terms of service for the regiment's remaining companies expired. Only about 200 soldiers from the regiment re–enlisted. The regiment was consolidated into a single battalion at Charles Town, West Virginia, during September 1864, and was absorbed by the 6th West Virginia Cavalry Regiment on December 14, 1864. During the regiment's time as the 2nd West Virginia Infantry and the 5th West Virginia Cavalry, it lost three officers and 68 enlistees killed or mortally wounded. Disease killed an additional 118, making total deaths 189.

== See also ==
- Medals of Honor for West Virginia Soldiers
- West Virginia Units in the Civil War
- West Virginia in the Civil War
