= 6th West Virginia Cavalry Regiment =

- Flag of West Virginia
- Active: January 26, 1864, to May 22, 1866
- Country: United States
- Allegiance: Union
- Branch: Cavalry

The 6th West Virginia Cavalry Regiment was a cavalry regiment that served in the Union Army during the American Civil War.

== Service ==
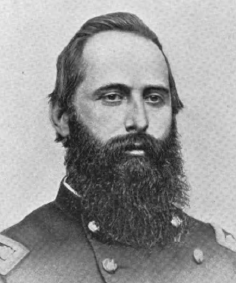
Lt. Col. Francis Thompson

The 6th West Virginia Cavalry Regiment was organized from the 3rd West Virginia Infantry Regiment on January 26, 1864. The regiment absorbed the remaining battalion of the 5th West Virginia Cavalry Regiment on December 14, 1864. The 6th West Virginia Cavalry Regiment mustered out at Fort Leavenworth, Kansas, on May 22, 1866.

== Casualties ==
The 6th West Virginia Cavalry Regiment suffered 5 officers and 28 enlisted men killed or mortally wounded in battle and 2 officers and 201 enlisted men dead from disease for a total of 236 fatalities.

== Commanders ==
- Colonel David T. Hewes (Dismissed February 15, 1864)
- Lt. Colonel Frank W. Thompson

== See also ==
- Medals of Honor for West Virginia Soldiers
- West Virginia Units in the Civil War
- West Virginia in the Civil War

== Notes ==
=== References ===
- Dyer, Frederick H. (1908). A Compendium of the War of the Rebellion. Des Moines, Iowa: Dyer Pub. Co. OCLC 1028851810.
- Lang, Joseph J. (1895). Loyal West Virginia from 1861 to 1865 : With an Introductory Chapter on the Status of Virginia for Thirty Years Prior to the War. Baltimore, MD: Deutsch Publishing Co. OCLC 779093.
- Snell, Mark A. (2011). West Virginia and the Civil War : Mountaineers are Always Free. Charleston, SC: History Press. ISBN 978-1-61423-390-9. OCLC 829025932.
- Union Army (1908). The Union Army, Vol. 2: A History of Military Affairs in the Loyal States 1861-65, Records of the Regiments in the Union Army, Cyclopedia of Battles, Memoirs of Commanders and Soldiers; New York, Maryland, West Virginia and Ohio. Madison, Wisconsin: Federal Publishing Company.
