= Elkwater, West Virginia =

Unincorporated community in West Virginia, United States

- Unincorporated community
- Location within West Virginia Location within the United States
- Coordinates: 38°38′11″N 80°00′55″W
- Country: United States
- State: West Virginia
- County: Randolph
- Elevation: 2,123 ft (647 m)
- Time zone: UTC-5 (Eastern (EST))
  - Summer (DST): UTC-4 (EDT)
- Area codes: 304 & 681
- GNIS feature ID: 1551046

Elkwater is an unincorporated community in Randolph County, West Virginia, United States. Elkwater is located on U.S. Route 219 and West Virginia Route 55 along the Tygart Valley River, 5.6 miles (9.0 km) south-southwest of Huttonsville.

The community takes its name from nearby Elkwater Fork creek.

== History ==
A Union artillery fortification known as Camp Elkwater was built at Elkwater Fork in the summer of 1861 in what was then western Virginia. 3,000 Federal troops under General Joseph J. Reynolds were sent in September 1861 to repel the forces of General Robert E Lee in the wake of the Battle of Cheat Mountain.
