= 1st West Virginia Infantry Regiment =

- Flag of West Virginia
- Active: May 10, 1861–August 27, 1861; October 30, 1861–October 10, 1864
- Country: United States
- Allegiance: Union
- Branch: Infantry
- Engagements: Battle of Philippi; Skirmish at Bowman's Place; Battle of Rich Mountain; First Battle of Kernstown; Battle of Port Republic; Battle of Cedar Mountain; Battle of Rappahanock; Battle of Thoroughfare Gap; Battle of Second Bull Run; Second Battle of Kernstown; Battle of Cedar Creek

The 1st West Virginia Infantry Regiment was an infantry unit that served in the Union Army during the American Civil War.

During its period of service, the regiment was known as the 1st Virginia Volunteer Infantry Regiment, but often referred to with, "Union," "Loyal" or "West" in front to distinguish it from Confederate Army regiments. It was the first regiment mustered into service on southern soil after Lincoln's call for 75,000 troops. It was formed three days before the Wheeling Convention, which was assembled to decide western Virginia's response if Virginia seceded from the Union.

== Service ==
=== 3 month service ===
The first incarnation of the 1st West Virginia Infantry Regiment (known as the 1st Virginia at the time) was organized at Wheeling, Virginia, in May, 1861 from volunteer companies from Hancock, Brooke, Ohio, and Marshall counties (the Northern Panhandle of the state). These companies had been formed by pro-Union citizens of these counties in April 1861, after the Commonwealth of Virginia voted to secede from the Union, in order to resist Confederate incursions. The Regiment was mustered into United States service by companies for a period of three months (the first company, Company A, was mustered into service on May 10, while the final company, Company K, was mustered on May 23). Company A (from the Fourth Ward of Wheeling) had actually been organized, as the Rough and Ready Guards, on April 18, 1861, the day after the state convention voted for secession. Like the 3-year regiment however the 3-month organization was composed primarily by men from Ohio and Pennsylvania.

Under the command of Colonel Benjamin Franklin Kelley and the 1st Virginia traveled from Wheeling by train on May 27 to near Mannington to secure a bridge on the Baltimore and Ohio Railroad, which had been destroyed by the rebels. After remaining there two days, the regiment advanced again, seizing the important railroad junction of Grafton on May 30 from a body of Virginia state militia under command of Confederate Col. George A. Porterfield. On June 1, Isaac Duval took command as Major of the regiment. Porterfield's troops retreated to Philippi where, on June 3, they were defeated by a Union force which included the 1st Virginia Infantry. The Battle of Philippi was the first land battle of the Civil War. During the battle, Col. Kelley was seriously wounded. The Regiment remained on duty at Rowlesburg, Grafton, and Philippi until July.

During the remainder of their three months service, the regiment was separated. A detachment of five companies served with Major General George B. McClellan in the Rich Mountain campaign. Another detachment was with Col. Erastus B. Tyler in a campaign against Confederate Brigadier General Henry A. Wise, who at that time had attempted an invasion of western Virginia. The remainder of the regiment guarded the Baltimore and Ohio Railroad. On August 19, they returned to Wheeling where the 3-months regiment was mustered out of Federal service on August 27, 1861.

=== 3 year service ===
The second incarnation of the 1st West Virginia Volunteer Infantry Regiment was mustered in for three year's service on October 30 at Wheeling, Virginia. It was known as the 1st Virginia until West Virginia became a state. Among the more notable members was the chaplain, James McCook, a member of the famed Fighting McCooks. An analysis of the regiment by the George Tyler Moore Center in Shepherdstown, West Virginia, shows that it was composed of 39% native West Virginians, while 23% were from Ohio, 18% Pennsylvania, 11% were immigrants and 8% were from other U.S. states.

Following the expiration of the original three-year term of enlistment, veterans of the regiment who chose to re-enlist were amalgamated with the 5th West Virginia Volunteer Infantry Regiment on October 10, 1864, to form the 2nd West Virginia Veteran Volunteer Infantry Regiment.

== Casualties ==
The 1st West Virginia suffered 3 officers and 51 enlisted men killed or mortally wounded in battle and 2 officers and 136 enlisted men dead from disease for a total of 192 fatalities. A member of Company G was killed in camp on May 29, 1861, from the accidental discharge of a gun.

== Officers ==
=== Commanders ===
- Benjamin Franklin Kelley
- Joseph Thoburn, originally the regimental surgeon of the 3-month unit
- William H. Enochs

=== Other officers ===
- Lt. Col. Henry B. Hubbard
- Maj. Isaac H. Duval (later promoted to brigadier general)

== See also ==
- West Virginia Units in the Civil war
- West Virginia in the Civil War

== Bibliography ==
- The Civil War Archive, Union Regimental Histories - West Virginia, 1st Regiment Infantry (3 Months)
- "The First West Virginia Infantry". West Virginia History Journal. 55: 41–94. 1996. Archived from the original on 2016-02-28. (reprinted from the Annual Report of the Adjutant General of the State of West Virginia for the Year Ending December 31, 1864)
- Rawling, C. J. (1887). History of the First Regiment Virginia Infantry. Philadelphia: J. B. Lippincott Company.
