= Benjamin Franklin Kelley =

American soldier (1807–1891)

- Benjamin Franklin Kelley
- Born: April 10, 1807; New Hampton, New Hampshire, US
- Died: July 16, 1891 (aged 84); Oakland, Maryland, US
- Burial place: Arlington National Cemetery
- Military career
- Allegiance: United States; Union
- Branch: United States Army; Union Army
- Service years: 1861–1865
- Rank: Brigadier General; Brevet Major General
- Unit: 1st West Virginia Volunteer Infantry
- Conflicts: American Civil War: Battle of Philippi Races; Battle of Romney; Battle of Blue's Gap; Gettysburg Campaign; Averell's Salem Raid; Battle of Folck's Mill; Battle of Moorefield
- Other work: revenue collector, Indian agent, examiner of pensions

Benjamin Franklin Kelley (April 10, 1807 – July 16, 1891) was an American soldier who served as a brigadier general in the Union Army during the American Civil War. He played a prominent role in several military campaigns in West Virginia and Maryland.

== Biography ==
=== Early life ===
Kelley was born in New Hampton, New Hampshire, a small village. At the age of 19, he went to Wheeling, West Virginia. He engaged in the merchandise business until 1851, when he became a freight agent for the Baltimore and Ohio Railroad.

=== Civil War ===
At outbreak of the American Civil War, he was living in Philadelphia, and working for the Baltimore and Ohio Railroad. He left his position there and moved to Wheeling to take command of the 1st Virginia Infantry, a Federal volunteer three-months regiment, and was appointed as its colonel. His first service was at Philippi, where he captured the Confederate camp equipage and was himself badly wounded. He was promoted to brigadier general of volunteers on August 5, 1861, backdated to May, and was victorious at Romney and Blue's Gap (Hanging Rocks Pass). Afterward, Kelley commanded a division of 10,000 men in the Department of Harper's Ferry.

In 1862 he served under Maj. Gen. John C. Frémont, and the following year he was in command of the West Virginia department and pursued General Robert E. Lee during the Retreat from Gettysburg. In 1864, he checked the enemy at Folck's Mill, New Creek, and Moorefield, West Virginia. He was brevetted as a major general of volunteers on August 5, 1864.

Kelley, along with his immediate superior Maj. Gen. George Crook, was captured by a small raiding party of Confederate partisans on February 21, 1865. Kelley was sent to a prison in Richmond, Virginia, but he and Crook were released on March 20 by a special exchange. He resigned from the army on June 1, 1865.

=== Postwar career ===
After the war ended, Kelley was appointed an internal revenue collector in 1866. After serving in that role for ten years, he became the head of the Hot Springs, Arkansas, Military Reservation in 1876. In 1883, President Chester A. Arthur appointed him an examiner of pensions.

=== Death ===
Kelley died in Oakland, Maryland, and was interred in Arlington National Cemetery. His grave was created by sculptor W.S. Davis and completed ca. 1861. The gravestone is made of granite (6 x 5 x 3 ft.) with a relief (2 x 2 x 6 ft.) of bronze inset on the front of the stone, just above two inscribed plaques. The relief is a bust of Kelley, who has a full goatee, mustache, and a military uniform.

One plaque on the gravestone is inscribed:

BENJAMIN F. KELLEY
COLONEL 1ST VIRGINIA VOLUNTEER INFANTRY
BRIGADIER AND BREVET MAJOR GENERAL
U.S.V.
WOUNDED AT THE BATTLE OF PHILLIPI VIRGINIA
JUNE 3, 1861.

Another plaque on the gravestone is inscribed:

HIS WIFE
MARY CLARE BRUCE KELLEY
DIED DECEMBER 24, 1910

It was surveyed by the Smithsonian's Save Outdoor Sculpture! survey in 1995 and was declared as needing treatment.

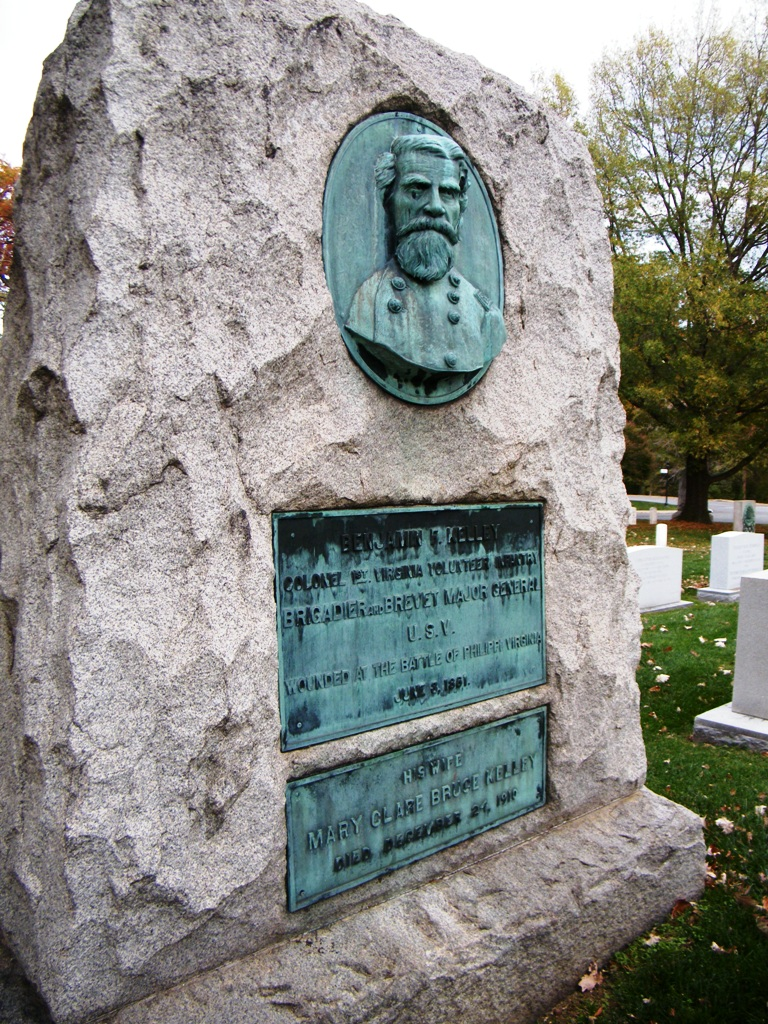
Front

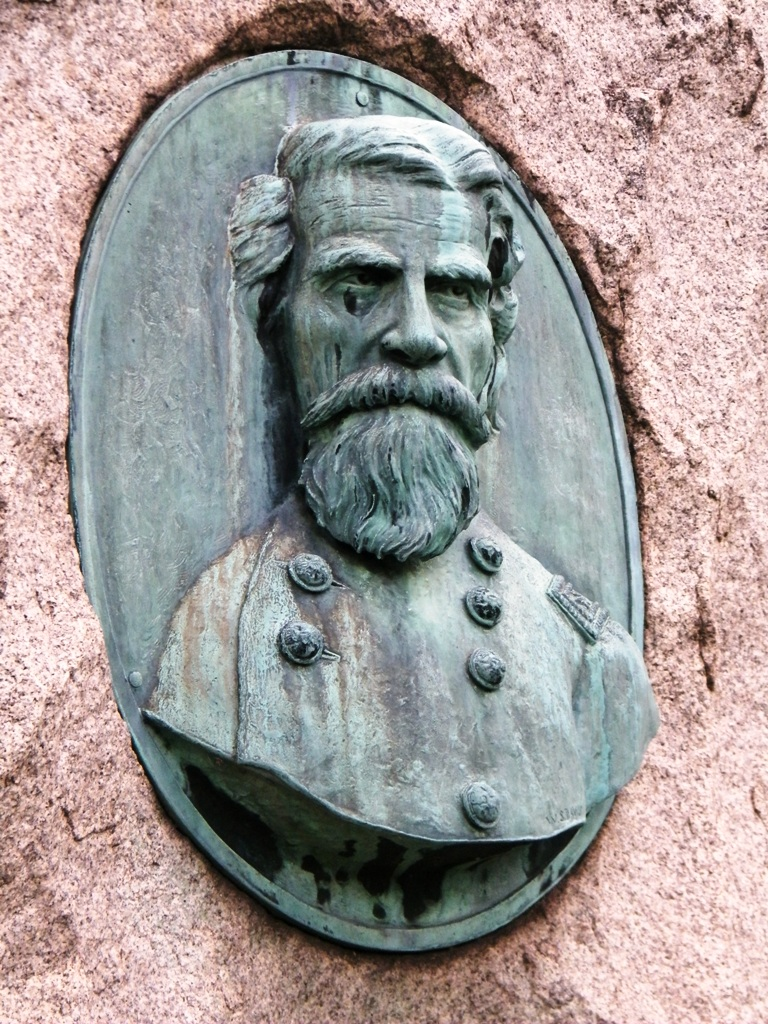
Detail

== See also ==
- List of American Civil War generals (Union)
