= Medals of Honor for West Virginia Soldiers =

West Virginia Soldier's Medal

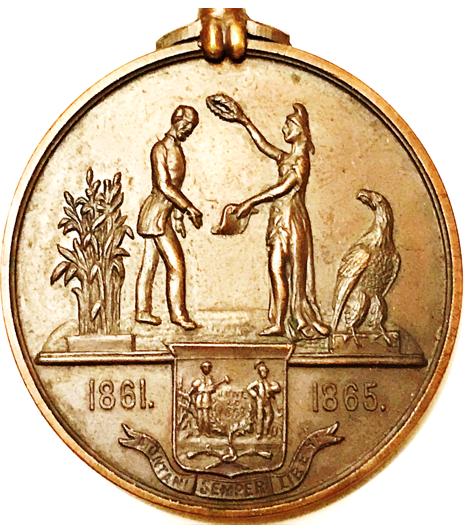
- Medal of Honor for West Virginia soldiers Honorably Discharged
- Type: Military medal
- Awarded for: 1) Honorably discharged 2) Killed in battle 3) Died from wounds/disease
- Presented by: State of West Virginia
- Eligibility: Officers and soldiers who served for the United States (Union) in West Virginia units during the American Civil War
- Established: February 5, 1866

Highlights
- Total recipients: 26,099

The Medals of Honor for West Virginia Soldiers are for those who served for West Virginia on behalf of the United States during the American Civil War. The medals were authorized by the state legislature during 1866. A total of 26,099 medals were minted for Union veterans of West Virginia military units. Original plans called for four versions of the medal, but the inability to differentiate between those that died from wounds and those that died from disease caused the third and fourth version to be combined.

The medals were patterned on the Ohio Veteran Volunteer Medal and the Crimean War medal. The artist "J. Sigel" was one of the designers of the West Virginia version. The medals were produced by Mr. A. Demarest, of New York. Three types of medals were produced. The Class I version, which had the most produced, commemorates those that were honorably discharged. The Class II version, which is the rarest, honors those that were killed in battle. The Class III version commemorates those that died of disease or from wounds received in battle.

The state of West Virginia distributed about 14,000 medals during the first year of availability, and approximately 2,500 additional medals in 1868. Since then, distribution has been slow because of the state's inability to contact the veterans, or their next of kin, eligible to receive the medal. As of 2019, slightly less than 3,400 medals were still available for relatives to claim.

== West Virginia Background ==
Fighting in the American Civil War began on April 12, 1861. The state (or commonwealth) of Virginia seceded from the United States on April 17, 1861, and joined seven southern states (three additional states seceded later) in the Confederate States of America. In the northern and western portions of Virginia, many people preferred to remain loyal to the United States (a.k.a. the Union). Virginians loyal to the United States approved pursuing their own statehood on October 24, 1861, and the western portion of Virginia officially became the state of West Virginia on June 20, 1863.

While the northern portion of the new state along the Ohio River was mostly pro-Union, that was not the case further south. Roughly 20,000 to 22,000 West Virginians fought for the Union, while a similar number fought for the Confederacy. The total fighters for the Union increases when natives of border states that fought in West Virginia regiments are included. Ohio and Pennsylvania were major contributors. In some cases, recruiters from Ohio and Pennsylvania had already achieved their enlistment quotas, so recruits from those states enlisted in West Virginia. An example of this is the 2nd West Virginia Infantry Regiment, which had four companies that were organized in Pittsburgh, Pennsylvania. A second example is the 2nd West Virginia Cavalry Regiment. This regiment was organized with recruits mainly from southeastern Ohio, and planned to be called the 4th Ohio Cavalry. Ohio's governor refused to accept the unit's application, stating that he had instructions to recruit no more cavalry. The regiment was accepted by the provisional governor of the alternative (West) Virginia government, loyal to the United States, that was headquartered in Wheeling. The regiment's original name was 2nd Regiment of Loyal Virginia Volunteer Cavalry.

== History ==
[No. 11.] A Joint Resolution providing Medals of Honor for West Virginia Soldiers

Resolved by the Legislature of West Virginia, That the governor procure, or cause to be procured, suitable medals as tokens of respect to the officers and soldiers of West Virginia who have served during the rebellion in the service of the United States, containing upon one side the name of the recipient, with his regiment, battalion or battery, surrounded by a wreath; upon the reverse side some appropriate design and inscription. The medal to be suspended by a piece of tri-colored silk ribbon; its artistic features to be equal to the Crimean medal, and its cost not to exceed one dollar each.

The medals and inscriptions to be of four kinds.
1) For the officers and soldiers of the volunteer army who have been or may be honorably discharged from the service.
2) For the officers and soldiers who have been killed in battle.
3) For the officers and soldiers who have died from wounds received in battle.
4) For the officers and soldiers who have died from diseases contracted in the service.

The medals for the officers and soldiers who have been killed in battle or who have died of wounds or disease in the service, to be delivered to the families of said officers and soldiers.

Adopted, February 1, 1866

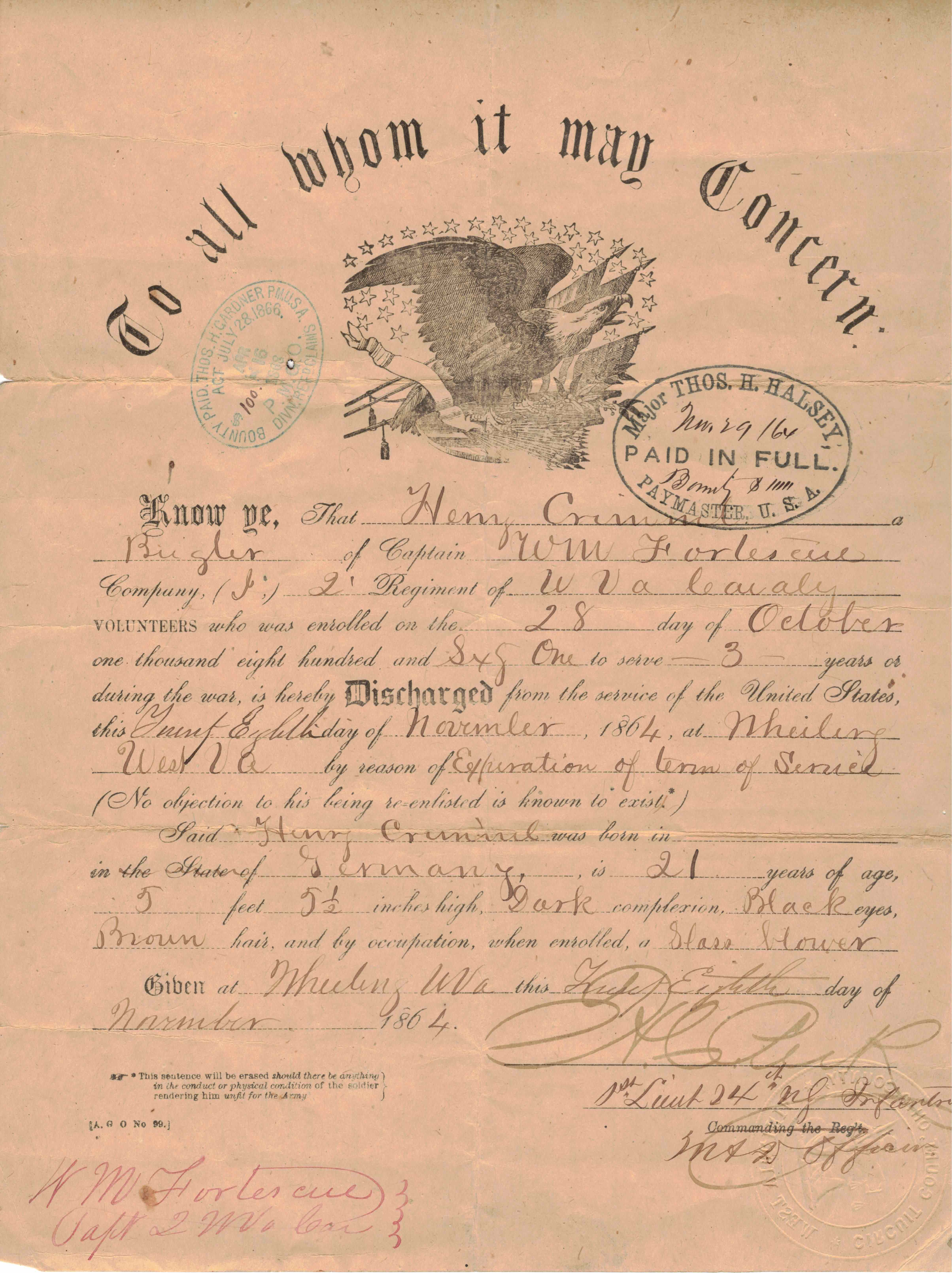
1864 Honorable Discharge paper

West Virginia's first governor, Arthur I. Boreman, wrote to a veteran in 1867 that the West Virginia medals were "a slight testimonial of the high appreciation, by the State, of your Devotion, Patriotism and Services". (Note: West Virginia military regiments were present for many of the battles fought in West Virginia and Virginia. Examples are Piedmont, New Market, Cloyd's Mountain, Lynchburg, Winchester, and Cedar Creek. West Virginia regiments were also present in the region near Richmond in 1865, and eight West Virginia regiments were present for the surrender of Confederate General Robert E. Lee's Army of Northern Virginia in the Battle of Appomattox Court House.) The original resolution specified four types of medals. The first version related to the honorably discharged, while the second medal version was for those killed in action. A third version was for those that died of wounds, and the fourth version was for those that died from disease contracted while in service. It was quickly discovered that differentiating between "died of wounds" and "died from disease" was too difficult because hospital records did not always differentiate between the two. Therefore, the last two categories were combined into the same medal. This means that are three types of medals instead of four.

Officers and soldiers who were honorably discharged were instructed to provide the Adjutant General's office, in Wheeling, their name, rank, company, and regiment. They also needed to provide the Post Office, County, and State where they may be addressed. In the case of the other classes of medals, widows, nearest relatives, or friends were instructed to provide similar information.

The medals were authorized by a joint resolution of the West Virginia state legislature on February 1, 1866. The West Virginia Senate concurred on February 5, 1866. The West Virginia medals were authorized less than a year after the state of Ohio authorized its own medals. The West Virginia medals were to have artistic features similar to the Crimea Medal, and the Ohio Civil War medal was used as an example for the designers and manufacturer. (Note: Among the specifications for the Ohio medal for veteran volunteers were "suspended by a piece of tri-colored silk ribbon" and "artistic features to be equal to the Crimean Medal".) New Jersey authorized medals around the 40th anniversary of the war, and Massachusetts authorized medals in 1906. Those states have no plans to distribute any unclaimed medals, but West Virginia still has unclaimed medals it hopes to distribute to the appropriate descendants. As of April 2019, slightly less than 3,400 West Virginia medals have not been claimed.

== Appearance ==
The state of West Virginia produced 26,099 of these medals. (Note: An older source says 26,999 medals were produced.) The medals are made of copper, and are bronzed. Three, or possibly four, were made in silver. The manufacturer was Mr. A. Demarest of New York, and the cost to West Virginia was $1.00 (equivalent to $22 in 2025) each. Mr. J. Sigel was one of the artists involved with the design. The medals were finished with a proof surface, and are size 24 on the American scale used by the Numismatic and Antiquarian Society of Philadelphia. A total of 14,500 medals were distributed by the end of 1867, and an additional 2,560 medals were distributed in 1868. The back of each type of medal says "Presented by the State of West Virginia" with a wreath of laurel surrounding the words. In small print on the bottom is "A. Demarest" above "N.Y." Inscribed on the edge of each medal is the soldier's name and unit.

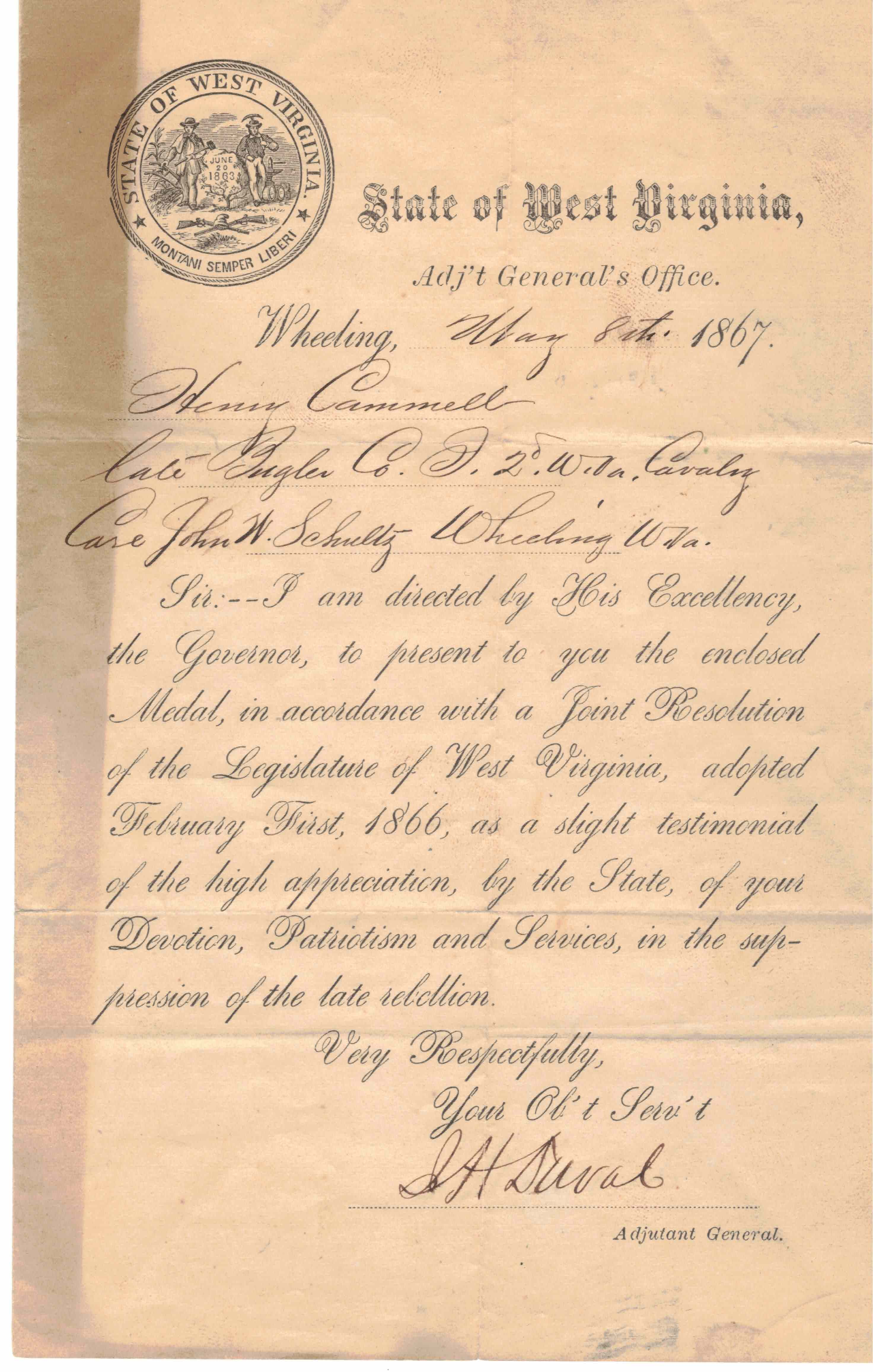
Paper that accompanies medal

- Class I - These medals were for those that were honorably discharged. More medals were produced for this classification than any other. The front has a figure of Lady Liberty on the right and a soldier on the left. Lady Liberty is putting a wreath on the head of the soldier with her right hand, while handing the soldier a scroll with her left hand. An eagle watches from behind Lady Liberty, while crops growing in a box are behind the soldier. Below the crops (on the left) is "1861", while "1865" is below the eagle. Between the dates are the motto and arms of the state of West Virginia. The medal hangs from a bronzed pin that says "HONORABLY DISCHARGED" and has an interlocked "W" and "V". A three–colored striped ribbon also hangs from the pin.
- Class II - These medals were for those that were killed in battle, and they are the rarest (fewer than 800) of the three classes. Like the Class I, the medal hangs from a pin and has a tri-colored ribbon. The bronze pin for this medal says "KILLED IN BATTLE". The lower half of the medal is similar to the Class I medal, with the same dates and motto. The scene on the top half of the coin shows a mounted officer leading troops into battle, and fallen soldiers can be seen on the left side. The left side also shows a cannon in disrepair.
- Class III - These medals were for those that died from wounds or died from disease while in service. The medal also has the bronzed pin and interlocking "W" and "V", and the same three-colored ribbon. The cover of the pin says "FOR LIBERTY". The lower half has the same motto with "1861" and "1865". The top half of the medal shows a coffin on a stand that says "DIED IN THE DEFENCE OF HIS COUNTRY" (spelled with a "C" instead of an "S"). Lady Liberty stands of the right side of the coffin, while a wounded soldier (arm in sling) stands on the left. On the top of the coffin is an open–winged eagle with numerous flags and tools of war.
West Virginia Medal of Honor images
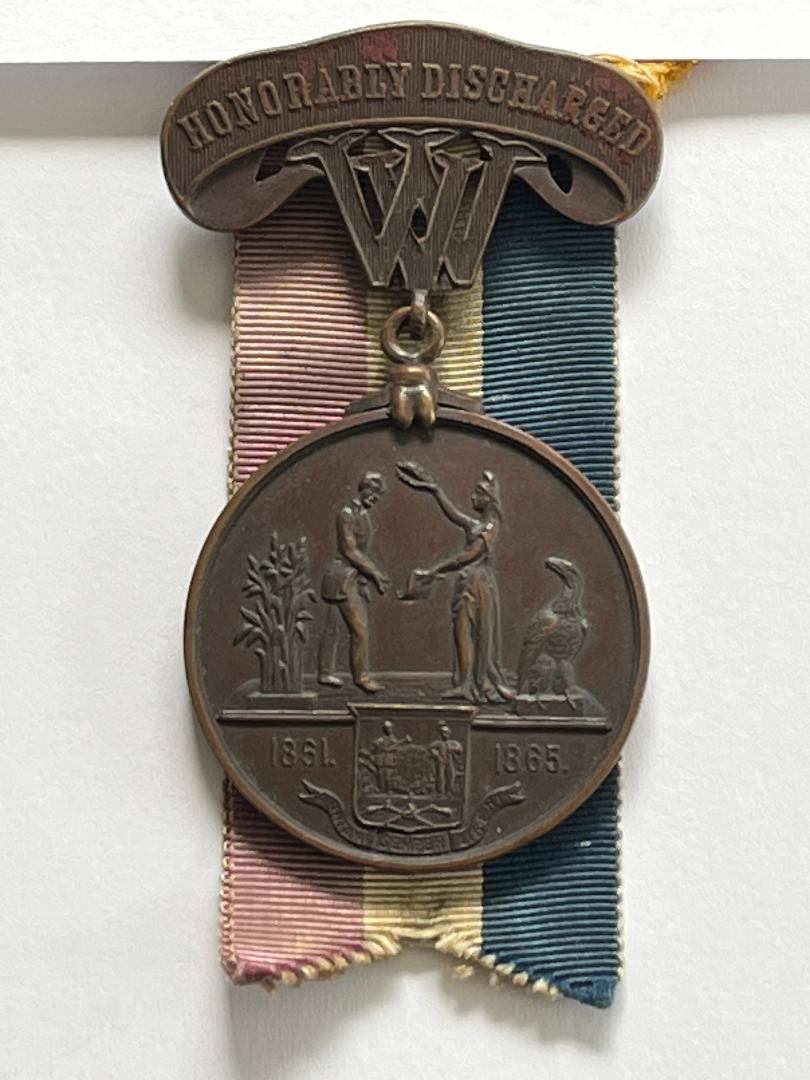
Class I, Honorably Discharged

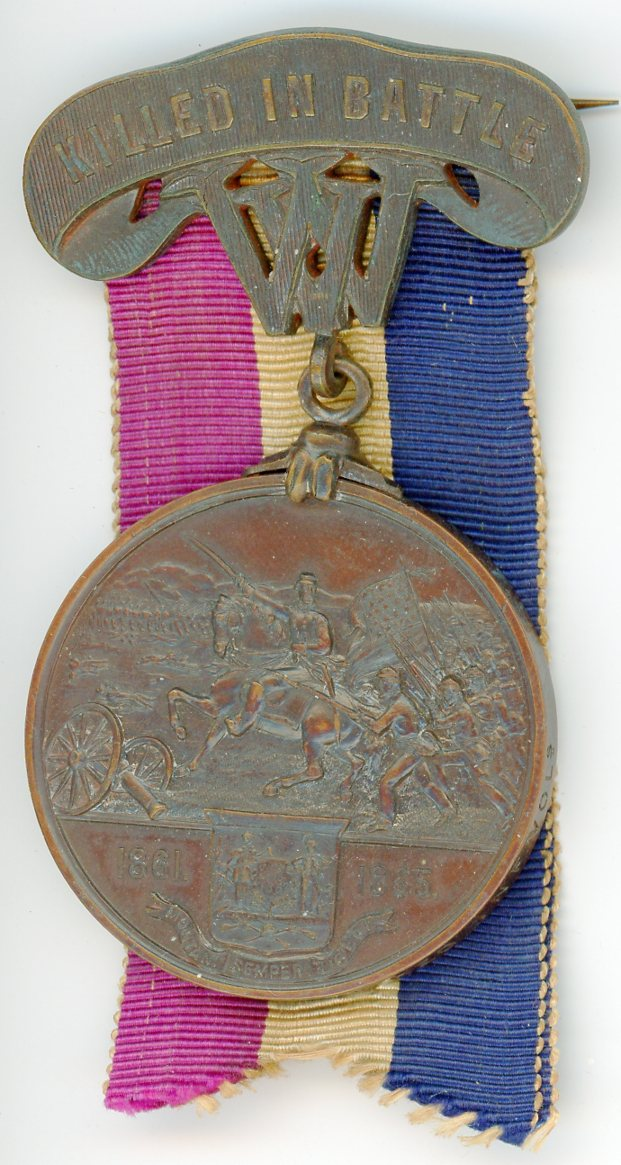
Class II, Killed in Battle

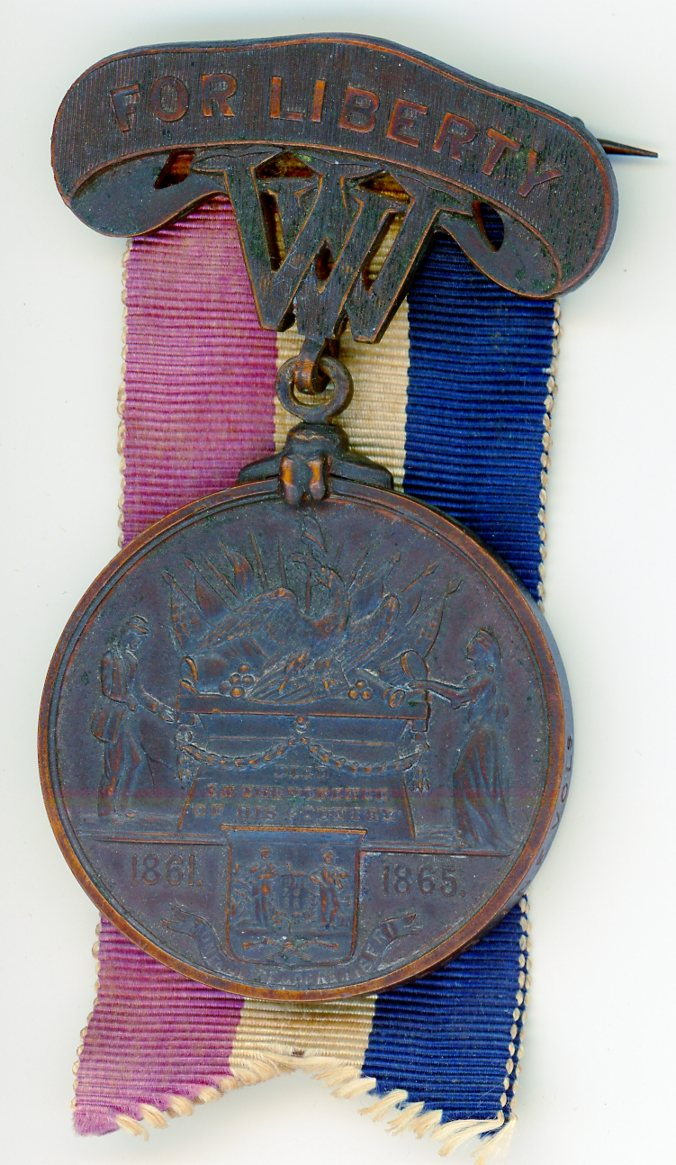
Class III, For Liberty

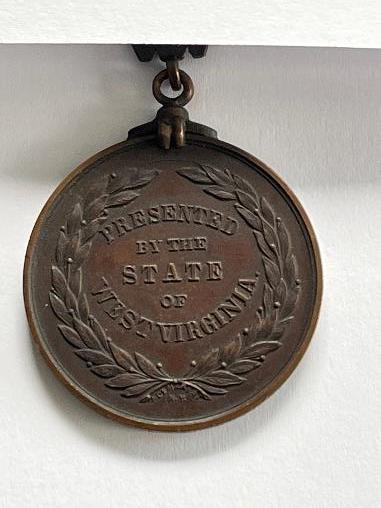
Back side of medal
