= Sinking Creek Raid =

Raid of the American Civil War

- Part of the American Civil War
- Greenbrier County in West Virginia
Date	November 26, 1862
Location	Greenbrier County, Virginia (now West Virginia)
Result	Union victory

Belligerents
United States (Union)	(Confederate States of America) CSA (Confederacy)

Commanders and leaders
Col. John C. Paxton; Major William H. Powell; 2nd Lt. Jeremiah Davidson	Lt. Col. John A. Gibson

Units involved
2nd Loyal Virginia Volunteer Cavalry	14th Virginia Cavalry

Strength
22	500

Casualties and losses
0	2 killed, 2 wounded, 100+ prisoners
- Entire rebel camp surprised and surrendered to union cavalry regiment's advance guard.

The Sinking Creek Raid took place in Greenbrier County, Virginia (now West Virginia) during the American Civil War. On November 26, 1862, an entire Confederate army camp was captured by 22 men from a Union cavalry during a winter snow storm. The 22 men were the advance guard for the 2nd Loyal Virginia Volunteer Cavalry, which was several miles behind. This cavalry unit was renamed 2nd West Virginia Volunteer Cavalry in 1863, after West Virginia became a state.

The Confederates, who were the rebels in the American Civil War, had an army camp near the foot of a mountain in Sinking Creek Valley. Their camp contained about 500 soldiers, who were surprised by the small group of Union cavalry men. Many of the rebels did not have their weapons loaded. The Union cavalry raced into the camp with sabers drawn, and quickly convinced the rebels to surrender in exchange for their lives. Over 100 rebel soldiers were taken prisoner. More than 100 horses and about 200 rifles were also captured, in addition to supplies and tents.

The leaders of the raid, Major William H. Powell and 2nd Lieutenant Jeremiah Davidson, both received promotions shortly afterwards. Powell was later awarded the Medal of Honor for this action. General George R. Crook said the Sinking Creek Raid was "one of the most daring, brilliant and successful of the whole war". Powell would eventually become a general. Davidson would rise to the rank of captain in the cavalry, and major in the infantry.

== Background ==
During September 1862, the Union army was forced to retreat from Western Virginia (the Kanawha River Valley) to Ohio by the Confederate army. This retreat was "embarrassing to the government". The army's commander, Colonel Joseph Andrew Jackson Lightburn, was replaced by General Jacob Dolson Cox, who reorganized the troops. During late October, Cox and the troops advanced to the Kanawha River Valley against no resistance. They made winter quarters in Charleston, as it was easier to be resupplied because of the river.

Among the Union troops was a cavalry regiment known as the 2nd Regiment of Loyal Virginia Volunteer Cavalry. This regiment was organized a year earlier, and consisted mostly of volunteers from Ohio counties near the Ohio River. Its commander was Colonel John C. Paxton. The regiment's quarters for the winter was at Camp Piatt, Virginia, about 12 miles (19.3 km) southeast of Charleston on the Kanawha River. The camp had a strategic location at the intersection of the Kanawha River, the James River, and the Kanawha Turnpike. The Kanawha River and Kanawha Turnpike were water and land routes to the Ohio River. Union troops and supplies were often moved by steamboat up the Kanawha River to Charleston and Camp Piatt. Charleston also had strategic value since a salt works was located nearby.

The 2nd Virginia Cavalry was glad to be back at winter quarters in Camp Piatt, Virginia, and believed they had completed their work for the year. On November 22, Colonel Paxton received a surprising order from the new division commander, recently promoted Brigadier General George Crook.

—Headquarters Kanawha Division, Charleston, Kanawha Co., Va., November 23, 1862

Colonel John C. Paxton, commanding the 2nd Regiment Loyal Virginia Cavalry, will proceed with all the serviceable men of his regiment to-morrow morning, November 24, to Cold Knob Mountain, in Greenbrier County, Va., via the Summerville and Lewisburg road, leaving Kanawha River route at Cannelton. On Cold Knob Mountain you will overtake Col. P. H. Lane, commanding the 11th Ohio Volunteer Infantry, ordered to that point to reinforce your command, from which position you will proceed against the camps of the 14th Rebel Virginia Cavalry Regiment, located in the Sinking Creek Valley, some two miles apart in winter quarters, recruiting. Break up the organization if possible.

—George Crook, Commanding Kanawha Division.

Thus, Paxton would lead cavalry and infantry in an attack on two rebel camps. One rebel camp was located in Sinking Creek Valley, and the other was 2 mi (3.2 km) west of the valley near Williamsburg. Before the regiment departed, General Crook confidentially told Major William H. Powell not to return to camp without good results.

=== To Cold Knob Mountain ===
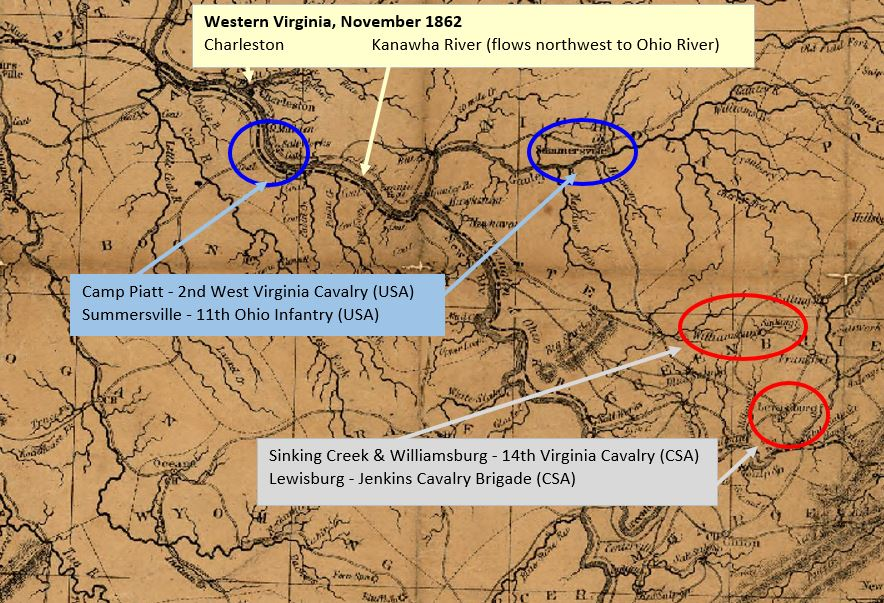
Western Virginia map from 1862 showing region between Charleston and Lewisburg

Paxton's cavalry regiment departed on November 24, traveling over 60 mi (96.6 km) towards Summersville—using less-explored roads to remain concealed. (Note: At least two sources, Lane and Sutton, call Summersville "Summerville". The official records also use "Summerville" instead of "Summersville". To be consistent with the sources, "Summerville" will be used elsewhere herein.) All companies were included except B and C, and this totaled to about 475 men. Their rendezvous point with the infantry was on Cold Knob Mountain. This mountain is one of the taller mountains in today's West Virginia, with an elevation of 4,183 feet (1,275.0 m).

The following day, the regiment traveled another 20 mi (32.2 km) in very cold weather before searching for a suitable place to make camp. Lieutenant Jeremiah Davidson of the advance guard was in charge of selecting a camp site. Proceeding with a guide far ahead of the advance guard, he suddenly found himself surrounded by five rebels. Davidson deceived the rebels, saying he was scouting for a campsite for Colonel Albert G. Jenkins' (rebel) cavalry. He also said that he got his blue uniform from a "Yankee". Satisfied, the rebels let Davidson proceed. Shortly thereafter, the rebels saw the rest of the advance guard of the 2nd Virginia Cavalry, and fled into the woods. The rebels were all captured, including a lieutenant captured by Major Powell. The regiment continued to the top of the mountain in extreme cold. A snow storm began that night (possibly earlier), and it was still snowing on the morning of the 26th. (Note: Sources do not agree exactly on the timing and amount of snow, and the amount of snow could have differed at different altitudes. Sutton, who was a private in Company H of the 2nd Virginia Cavalry, described "heavy snow" falling on the evening of November 25, and a "howling storm" on Cold Knob Mountain on November 26. Powell described the snow falling earlier, citing a "blinding snowstorm and with snow a foot deep" on November 25. He said "Resuming the march, we pressed forward through the snow, then nearly two feet deep, through the afternoon and night of the 25th, arriving on the summit of Cold Knob Mountain at early noon of the 26th, ..." Lane, who took a different route to the top of Cold Knob Mountain (and reached it earlier than the cavalry) said in his official report that "... we reached the top of Cold Knob, where we found a furious snow storm raging." In the same report, he said that the "snow was from 6 to 8 inches deep; the cold was intense, and the men almost exhausted.")

Colonel Philander P. Lane was the commander of the 11th Ohio Infantry. (Note: Although Crook's order listed "P. H. Lane" as commander of the 11th Ohio Infantry, the National Park Service lists him as "Philander P. Lane". He is also listed as "P. P. Lane" in the official records.) His regiment departed from its Summerville camp on November 24 with 500 men. The infantry's departure point and route were different from Paxton's cavalry. Lane's infantry marched through a rain storm on November 25, and reached the top of Cold Knob Mountain that evening—where there was a snow storm. Lane's report mentions frozen equipment and estimated that about 7 inches (17.8 cm) of snow was on the ground.

Paxton's cavalry met with Lane's infantry at a point on Cold Knob Mountain around noon on November 26. The two colonels conferred, and Lane decided that his regiment was not in condition to continue the mission. His men were wet and cold, and they began their return to their camp in Summerville. (Note: Although all agree that there was a snow storm on Cold Knob Mountain, accounts differ concerning the infantry returning to their base camp. Private Sutton, from the cavalry, indicated that Colonel Lane's infantry began its return to camp after a conference with Colonel Paxton, and the cavalry had "no thought of returning" since the rebels were already close by. Paxton's official report said that although Lane wished to return his infantry to his camp because of the severe weather, Paxton asked him to first take the advance until the enemy's pickets were engaged. Lane's official report described a rain storm on November 25, and a "furious snow storm" on November 26 with snow "6 to 8 inches deep", frozen clothing, and frozen equipment. He also says Paxton ordered him to "take the advance and drive in the enemy's pickets" and then "return to our camp". One West Virginia historian concluded that Lane "decided to call the expedition off", and the official reports make it appear that Paxton "allowed the Ohio troops to return".) Paxton also considered ending the mission, but decided to continue after being convinced by Major Powell. Powell was assigned to lead the advance guard, and selected Lieutenant Jeremiah Davidson and 20 men from Company G to join him. The advance guard, followed by the rest of the cavalry regiment, proceeded down the mountain toward the rebel camps.

== Raid ==
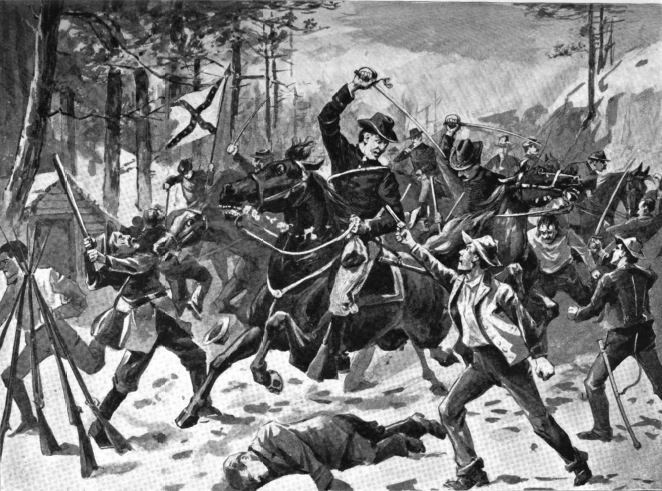
Major Powell leads surprise raid on Confederate cavalry camp

As the Union cavalry's advance guard rounded a sharp turn, it encountered four rebel scouts, and captured two of them. From the two prisoners, Major Powell's group was able to learn the location and strength of the two rebel camps. The two escaped rebels were not strongly pursued, and did not see the entire advance guard. They assumed they had encountered a small group of Union home guard, and had no concerns as they returned to a very quiet camp of about 500 men.

Observing that the two rebels returning to camp were not challenged by guards, Powell and his 21 men decided to capture the entire camp—despite the remaining portion of the regiment being too far away to offer immediate support. Each man in Powell's group was armed with a saber and two 54–caliber Navy Colt revolvers—meaning the group had over 200 shots before needing to reload. (Note: The popular Colt Navy 1861 models were .36–caliber or .44–caliber. Powell, as quoted by Jones, says "We were each armed with a sabre and a brace of Colt's 54-calibre navy revolvers ...") A decision was made to avoid shooting if possible—so the second rebel camp, which was located about 2 mi (3.2 km) away, would not be alarmed.

Powell and his men charged down the valley, a distance of about 0.5 mi (0.8 km), to the middle of the rebel cavalry camp. Many of the surprised rebels did not even have their weapons loaded. Some of the rebels tried to accost the Union cavalry by grabbing their legs, but were met with the butt of a Colt revolver or a saber. Powell demanded a surrender in exchange for sparing the lives of the rebels, and this was accepted. Thus, Powell, Davidson, and 20 men captured a camp of 500 Confederate cavalry men without firing a weapon, on November 26. (Note: Accounts differ for who was captured, how many, and who reached the rebel camp. Powell says rebel Lieutenant Colonel John A. Gibson, Major B. B. Eakle and Captain W. A. Lackey "promptly accepted, and surrendered the command". He also says "I captured the camp of 14th Virginia Cavalry, five hundred strong ...", and that Paxton reached the rebel camp after the surrender. Sutton says that because of the weather, "nearly all of the officers" were not present, and that the captures were 1 captain, 1 lieutenant, and 112 enlisted men. Paxton lists 1 captain, 1 lieutenant, and 111 enlisted men as those captured—plus 1 paroled. He also mentions only that Powell "led the charge" and Captain McMahon led the column. One West Virginia historian concluded that "90 percent of the Second never did get near the camp of the Confederates", and that hundreds of the prisoners escaped while the small group of union soldiers escorted the large group back up the mountain. Concluding that by the time the small group of union soldiers "joined the main command, but a hundred and eleven prisoners remained of the great herd they had started with.")

== Aftermath ==
Many of the surprised rebels fled, and pursuit was difficult because of the terrain. Colonel Paxton and the regiment did not arrive in time for the rebel surrender, but the sight of the Union regiment prevented the other Confederate cavalry camp from attacking. A second objective of the mission after "breaking up" the rebel camps was to continue to Covington to rescue a Union sympathizer held by the Confederates. However, the cavalry was forced to return to its home camp because of the large number of prisoners and captured horses in its possession. Colonel Paxton's report said that 2 rebels were killed, 2 were wounded, and 1 was paroled. Two officers (1 captain and 1 lieutenant) were captured. Non-commissioned officers and privates taken prisoner totaled to 111. Also captured were 106 horses and 5 mules. About 200 Enfield and Mississippi rifles were destroyed, as were 50 sabers. Additional supplies and tents were also destroyed. Union casualties were two horses killed.

=== Return to camp ===
Medal of Honor

Moving with the prisoners (most of them on captured horses), the cavalry began its return to its home camp at 4:00 pm on November 26. A concern for the regiment in addition to the rebel cavalry at the second camp was the cavalry of Colonel Jenkins, which was camped at Lewisburg about 12 mi (19.3 km) southeast of the Sinking Creek camp. Paxton and the main body of the regiment took charge of the prisoners, while Powell led the rear guard. Jenkins' cavalry and Powell's rear guard skirmished briefly, but Powell held the high ground and Jenkins returned to Lewisburg.

The exhausted force had been moving almost constantly over the last 70 hours, in severe weather. Soldiers were falling asleep, and the officers' biggest task was simply to keep the group together on a road with 1 foot (0.3 m) of snow. The 2nd Virginia stopped at daybreak on November 27. Hundreds of campfires were quickly built to thaw men and horses. Men were fed coffee and bacon, while horses were fed grain. After 2 hours, the regiment was in motion again. It reached Summerville (home camp for Lane's infantry) by afternoon, and rested there until the next morning (November 28). The unit lost 10 horses from exhaustion during its journey home. Some of the men had frozen feet, and two remained in Summerville (after having their boots cut off their feet) until they were sufficiently recovered to be able to be moved to the hospital at Camp Piatt. The unit arrived at Kanawha Falls (a.k.a. Galley Bridge) around 7:00 pm on November 28. Prisoners and captured horses were given to Union General Eliakim P. Scammon, and the 2nd Virginia camped for the night. Leaving early the next morning, the regiment reached its home camp during the afternoon of November 29.

=== Promotions ===
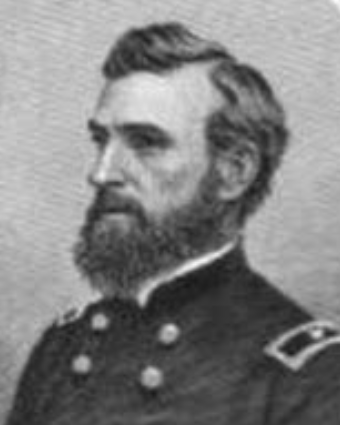
Brig. Gen. W. H. Powell

Following the raid, Major Powell was promoted to lieutenant colonel, and 2nd Lieutenant Davidson was promoted to 1st lieutenant. Both men received more promotions during the war. Davidson was promoted to captain on January 27, 1863. On May 18, Powell was promoted to colonel, and became commander of the regiment. West Virginia became a state on June 22—and the 2nd Regiment of Loyal Virginia Volunteer Cavalry became known as the 2nd West Virginia Volunteer Cavalry Regiment. On July 18, Powell was severely wounded in the Wytheville Raid. He became a prisoner of war until he was exchanged on January 29, 1864. He returned to command the 2nd West Virginia Cavalry on March 20.

During 1864, Powell, Davidson, and the 2nd West Virginia Cavalry left the western Virginia region to fight in the Shenandoah Valley. Powell commanded a brigade. Captain Davidson was severely wounded in the Second Battle of Kernstown on July 24. He was thought to have been killed, but crawled to a home where civilians saved his life. He rejoined the army in September, and finished his career as a major in an Ohio infantry.

After the Battle of Fisher's Hill, Powell became a division commander, and was promoted to brigadier general on October 19, 1864. He resigned in 1865. Years after the war, he was awarded the Medal of Honor for his performance in the Sinking Creek Raid. General Crook, in a letter written to Powell in 1889, said "... I have always regarded the part you took in that expedition as one of the most daring, brilliant and successful of the whole war."

== Notes ==
=== References ===
- Cox, Jacob Dolson (1900). Military Reminiscences of the Civil War Volume I. New York: Charles Scribner's sons. OCLC 2218391.
- Jones, J. W. (1897). The story of American heroism : thrilling narratives of personal adventures during the great Civil War, as told by the medal winners and roll of honor men. Springfield, Ohio. OCLC 11816985.
- Lang, Joseph J. (1895). Loyal West Virginia from 1861 to 1865 : with an introductory chapter on the status of Virginia for thirty years prior to the war. Baltimore, MD: Deutsch Publishing Co. OCLC 779093.
- Ohio Roster Commission (1895). Official Roster of the Soldiers of the State of Ohio in the War of the Rebellion, 1861–1866. Norwalk, Ohio: The Lanning Company. OCLC 37199818. "William H. Powell."
- Scott, Robert Nicholson; Lazelle, H. M.; Davis, George B. (1887). The War of the Rebellion: a compilation of the official records of the Union and Confederate armies Series I Volume XIX Part 1. Washington, DC: Government Printing Office. OCLC 427057.
- Sutton, Joseph J. (2001) [1892]. History of the Second Regiment, West Virginia cavalry volunteers, during the war of the rebellion. Huntington, WV: Blue Acorn Press. ISBN 978-0-9628866-5-2. OCLC 263148491.
- Tucker, Dr. Spencer C. (2013). American Civil War : The Definitive Encyclopedia and Document Collection. Santa Barbara, California: ABC-CLIO, LLC. ISBN 978-1-85109-682-4. OCLC 864098559.
