= Powell-Redmond House =

Historic house in West Virginia, United States

- U.S. National Register of Historic Places
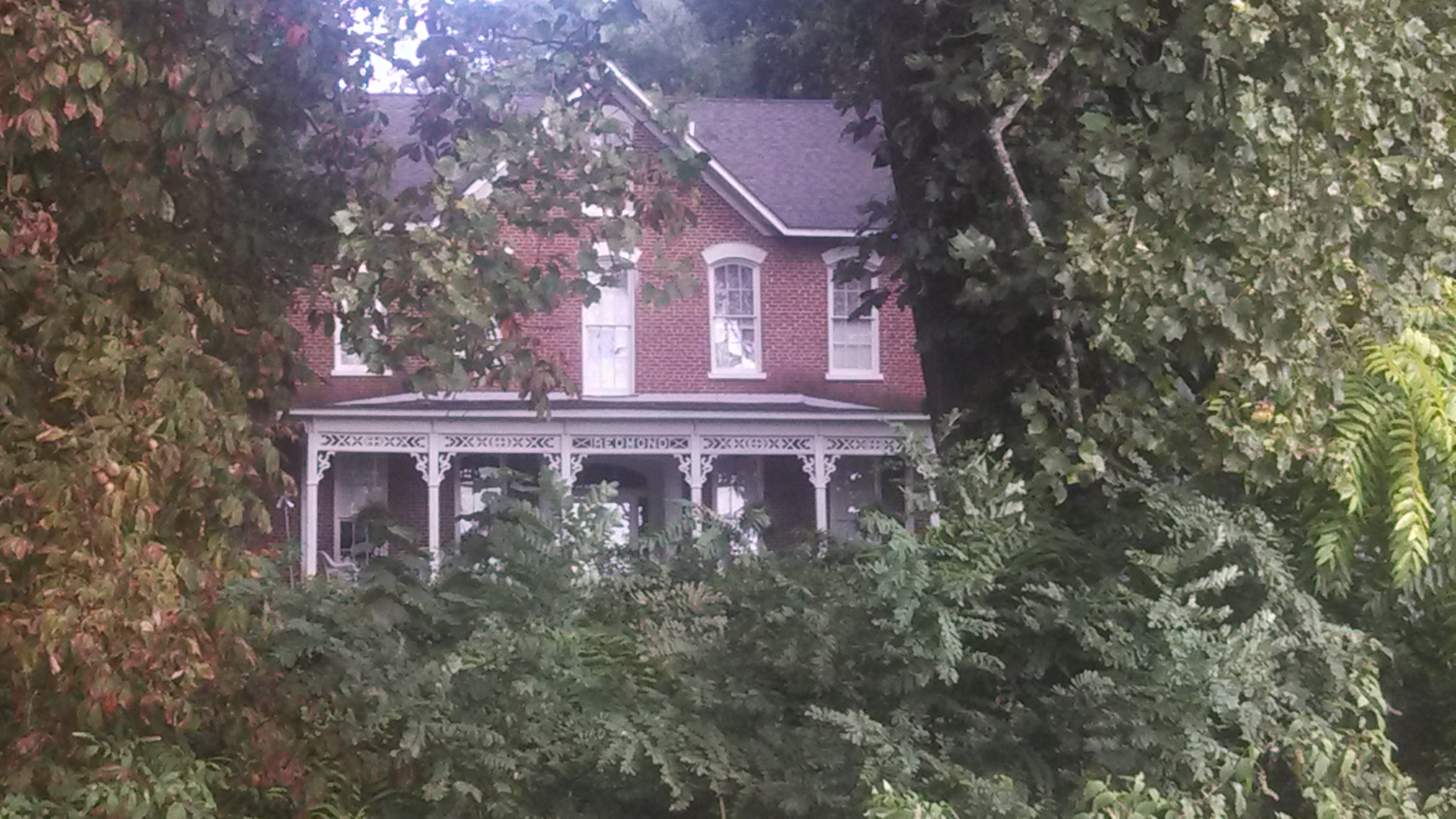

- Location within West Virginia Location within the United States
- Location: 23 Columbia St., Clifton, West Virginia
- Coordinates: 39°0′5″N 82°2′23″W
- Area: 3.3 acres (1.3 ha)
- Built: 1866
- Architectural style: Italianate
- NRHP reference No.: 83003243
- Added to NRHP: February 10, 1983

Powell-Redmond House is a historic home located at Clifton, Mason County, West Virginia. It was built in 1866, and is a 2 1/2-story red brick residence in the Italianate-style. It has a rear ell and features floor-length, doublehung, first story windows with heavy segmental stone lintels. The interior has a ballroom with a variety of intact ornamental plasterwork. It was built by William Henry Powell (1825–1904), who had established the Clifton Iron & Nail Company in 1866. Powell was a general in the American Civil War who fought mostly in West Virginia and Virginia.

It was listed on the National Register of Historic Places in 1983.
