= Clifton, West Virginia =

Unincorporated community in West Virginia, United States

- Unincorporated community
- Location within West Virginia Location within the United States
- Coordinates: 39°00′08″N 82°02′30″W
- Country: United States
- State: West Virginia
- County: Mason
- Elevation: 574 ft (175 m)
- Time zone: UTC-5 (Eastern (EST))
  - Summer (DST): UTC-4 (EDT)
- Area codes: 304 & 681
- GNIS feature ID: 1554151

Clifton is an unincorporated community in Mason County, West Virginia, United States. Clifton is located on the east bank of the Ohio River along West Virginia Route 62, 1.5 miles (2.4 km) south of Mason; Middleport, Ohio lies across the river. Clifton had a post office, which closed on May 24, 1997. As of the 2020 census, Clifton had a population of 277.

The community was named for the cliffs near the original town site.
