= Confederate government of West Virginia =

On June 20, 1863, the United States government created a new state from 50 western counties of Virginia to be named "West Virginia". This was done on behalf of a Unionist government in Wheeling, Virginia, approved by Congress and President Abraham Lincoln, though it was done with a low participation of the citizens within the new state.

There remained a large number of counties and citizens who still considered themselves as part of Virginia and the Confederacy which, in turn, considered the new state as part of Virginia and the Confederacy. In 1861 the 50 counties contained a population of 355,544 whites, 2,782 freemen, 18,371 slaves, 79,515 voters and 67,721 men of military age (16–40 years old). West Virginia was the 6th most contested state during the war, with 632 battles, engagements, actions and skirmishes.

Although considered a loyal Union state by the Federal government, half of its soldiers were enlisted in the Confederate army; it was the only border state which did not give most of its soldiers to the Union. While the Union army held much of the territory of the new state, large sections remained in the hands of guerrillas and bushwhackers. The Union army remained in West Virginia until 1869, and had dealt with civil unrest through 1868.

== Richmond convention ==
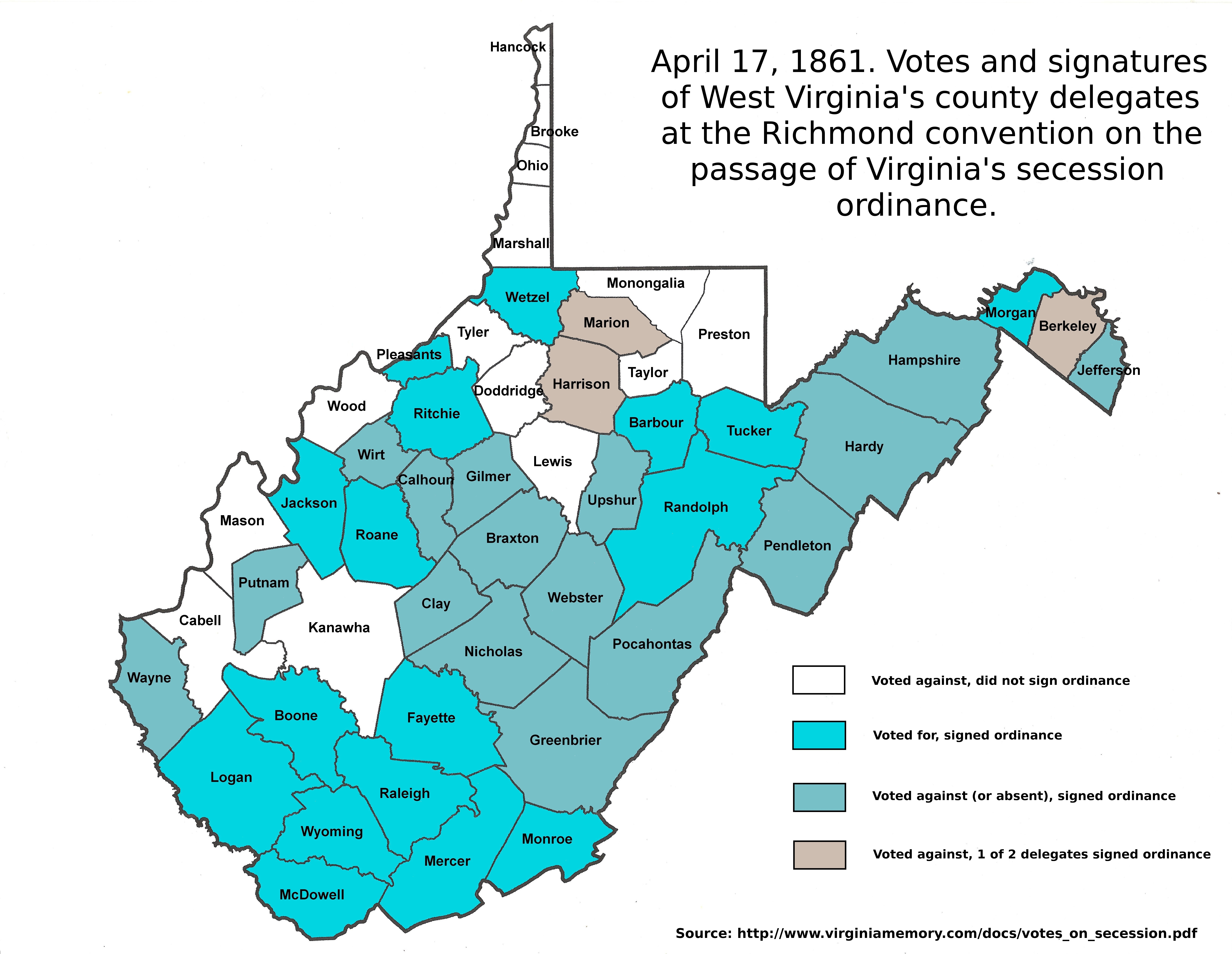
West Virginia delegate votes and signatures at the Richmond convention, April 17, 1861

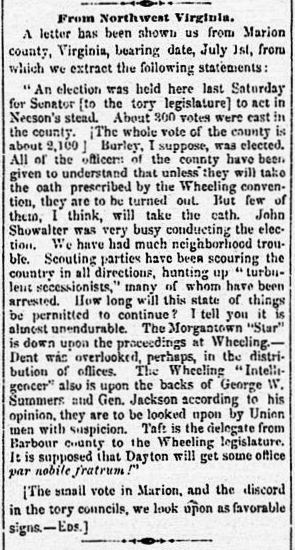
Richmond Enquirer, July 11, 1861, regarding Marshall M. Dent, John J. Jackson and George W. Summers

When the Richmond convention voted on April 17, 1861, to secede from the United States most of the delegates from the counties which became West Virginia voted against it; 32 against, 13 in favor, and 4 absent or abstained. The convention adjourned on May 1, to reconvene in June. With the movement of Union troops into West Virginia on May 26 the conditional Unionists threw their support to Virginia. Many delegates who had voted against the ordinance returned to the convention in June and signed it. Of the 49 delegates 29, representing 36 counties, signed the ordinance. Benjamin Wilson, a delegate from Harrison County, was arrested at his home in Clarksburg in June and could not return, though he had previously signed the ordinance in April. Some delegates, such as George Berlin of Upshur County, became refugees and settled in the Shenandoah Valley and other areas of Virginia beyond Union lines. Burwell Spurlock of Wayne County was one of the last to sign the ordinance in November. A number of delegates entered Confederate service; Samuel Woods, John Echols, Franklin P. Turner, Napoleon B. French, Johnson Orrick, Alpheus F. Haymond, Currence B. Conrad, and Benjamin W. Byrne, among others.

Five of the delegates who didn't sign the ordinance eventually ran afoul of the Union government in Wheeling. Sherrard Clemens actively campaigned against the new state and faced threats of violence and arrest. In October 1861 Marshall M. Dent was indicted for treason by a grand jury in Wheeling. Although the charges were not pursued his reputation among Unionists was ruined and he eventually closed his Morgantown newspaper, The Virginia Evening Star, the following January and ended his political career. John Jay Jackson, Sr. did not attend the second Wheeling convention or support the Pierpont government, but called it "a usurped government...founded in force". John Carlile, who had been the most ardent "new state" delegate, used his position as a senator of Virginia to derail the statehood bill in the senate, but failed. He continued in his role as a Virginia senator after the creation of West Virginia in 1863, but in 1864 he was arrested for treason on the direct order of President Lincoln. George W. Summers, who resigned from the convention at the end of the first session in May, addressed the militia in Charleston on June 8, 1861, and urged that they unite as one "...to defend old Virginia until every invader is driven from her soil."

== Secession sentiment in West Virginia ==
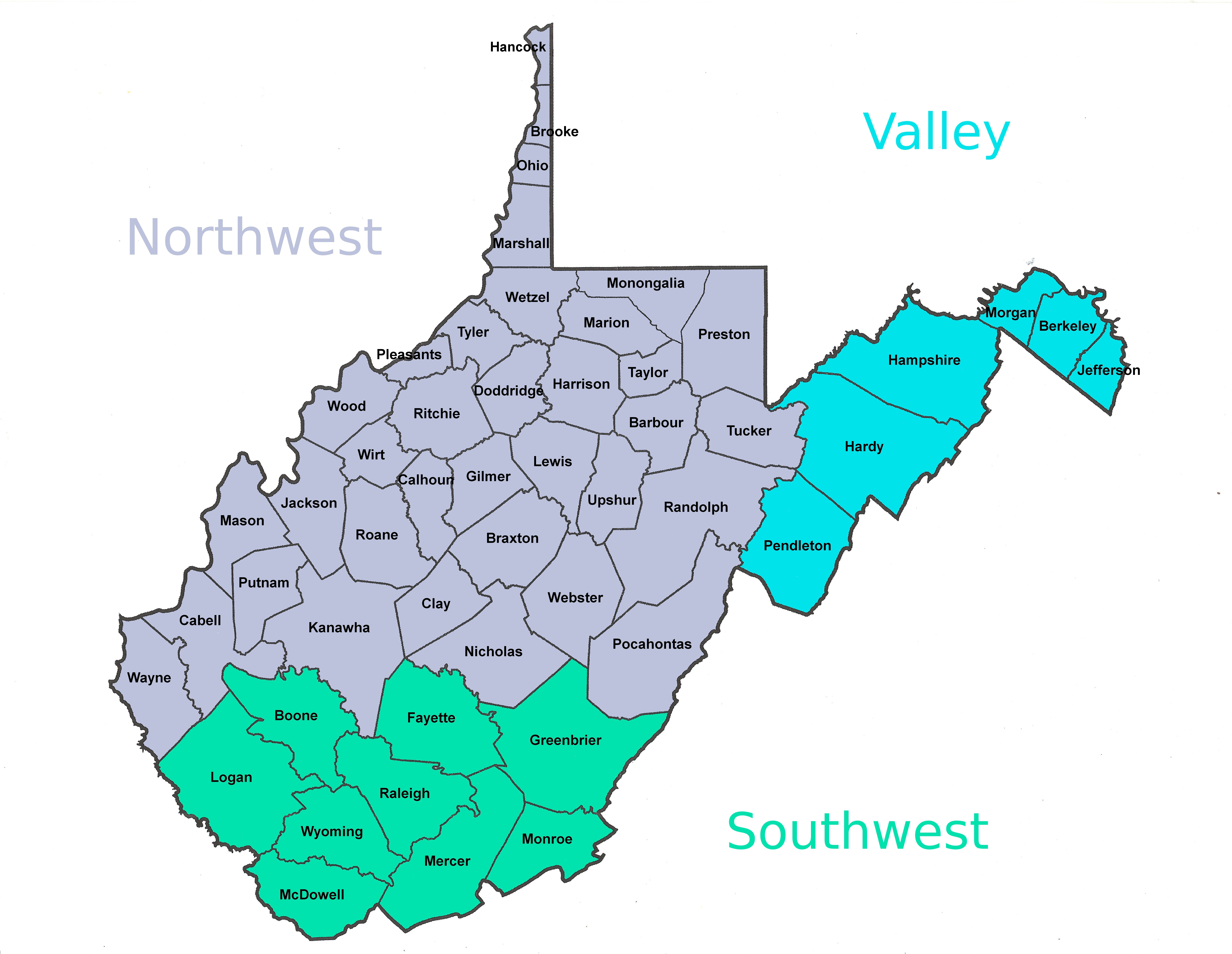
West Virginia regions 1863

West Virginia was created out of three regions of Virginia; the Northwest, the Shenandoah Valley, and the Southwest. When secession from the United States became an issue for Virginia, there was little support for it in the counties bordering the states of Ohio and Pennsylvania, but there was more support in the central and southern counties of what became West Virginia.

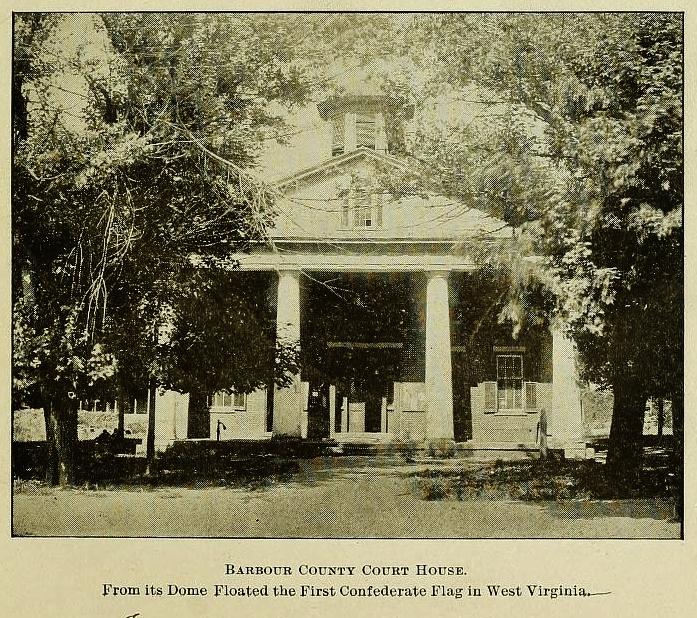
The Civil War era courthouse in Barbour County, West Virginia, where the first secession flag flew in West Virginia

In January 1861 the first secession flag in West Virginia flew above the courthouse in Philippi, Barbour County. Described as a "palmetto" flag, it was captured in the Battle of Philippi on June 3, 1861. A secession flag also flew above the courthouse in neighboring Tucker County, and another was raised in Guyandotte, Cabell County, which was termed a "secession hole" by Union newspapers in Wheeling, and was later burned by Union troops. On May 14, the "stars and bars" was raised above the courthouse in Logan County.

There were public meetings of "Southern Rights" supporters in at least 21 Northwestern counties. On April 26, 1861, former governor Joseph Johnson chaired such a meeting in Clarksburg. Secessionists were active in Jackson, Ritchie, Harrison, Wood, Wayne, Kanawha, Cabell, Taylor, Upshur, Marion, although these counties voted against the secession ordinance. Altogether 24 of the 50 counties in the new state voted in favor of secession. The secession counties held 40% of the population and two-thirds of the territory of the new state. Results of the May 23, 1861 vote on Virginia's secession ordinance has been estimated at 19,121 to 20,031 in favor of secession and 33,565 to 34,677 against secession.

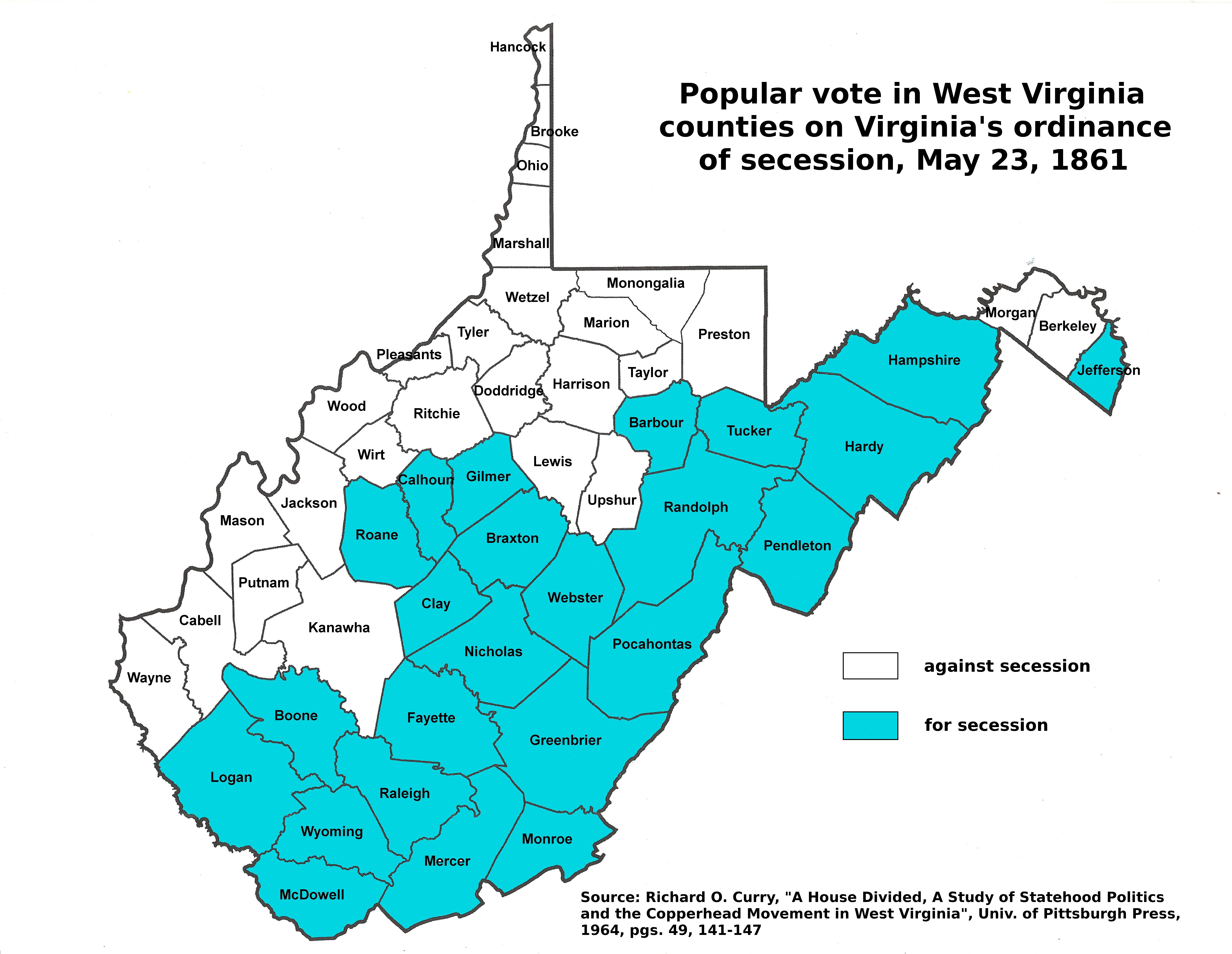
Counties in blue supported secession from the United States in the May 23, 1861 public vote

This resulted in a large area of West Virginia that was supportive of the Richmond government and the Confederacy. Union support eroded in some border counties when Union troops invaded western Virginia on May 26, 1861, just days after the vote on the secession ordinance. In the northwestern counties of West Virginia most enrolled 25% of their eligible men in Confederate units, many in excess of 50%. Putnam County, for example, was reported to have voted 944 to 202 against the secession ordinance, but when recruitment began it gave half of its soldiers to the Confederacy. A similar situation occurred in the counties of Cabell, Kanawha and Wayne. One factor hindering Unionism was "state pride" and resistance to outside interference in Virginia's affairs. One Ohio newspaper observed-

"There still remains that old 'State pride' which has been the vain-glorious boast of the Old Dominion...Western Virginia has too many Union men, and is too near Ohio, to actively join in such a resistance, but still, that impulse and State pride will be against us and we must expect to be hampered with it."

County courts in Jackson, Fayette, Hampshire, Monroe, Gilmer, Pocahontas, and Raleigh levied funds to arm militia for the defense of Virginia. When Gov. Letcher called out the militia there was no response from the counties along the northwestern border. The 107th Regiment of Randolph and Tucker counties were under the command of Gen. Robert S. Garnett, but after his death it disbanded. Two companies of the 119th Regiment of Taylor County responded, and later became part of the 31st Virginia Infantry and the 25th Virginia Infantry. Various companies of the 186th Regiment of Calhoun County became guerilla units or companies of Partisan Rangers in 1862 under the enactment of the Partisan Ranger Act. When the 141st militia of Jackson County was mustered at the courthouse and was told by their colonel that he was recruiting for the Union two-thirds of the men refused the call. The militia in the southern and Valley counties mostly responded to the governor's call. During Brig. Gen. Henry A. Wise's Kanawha campaign of late 1861 a brigade of militia under the command of Brig. Generals Alfred Beckley and Augustus A. Chapman was reported at a strength of 2,000 men.

== Confederate leaders ==
=== Military ===
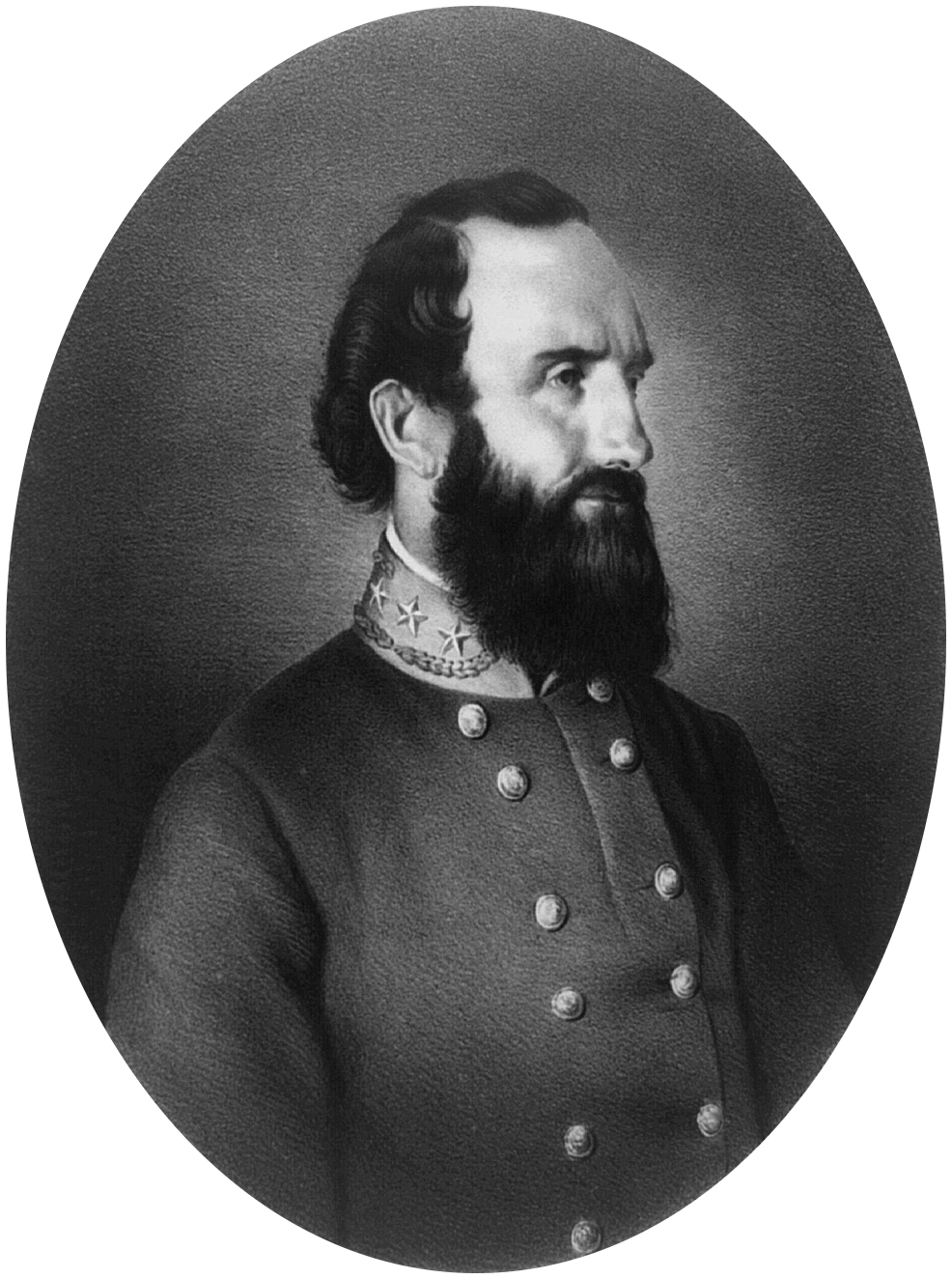
Gen. T.J. Jackson (Stonewall)

Sixteen Confederate general officers were either born in or living in the state at the time of the war. Three of these officers were in command of Virginia militia; Alfred Beckley, James Boggs, and Augustus A. Chapman. The most senior general was Stonewall Jackson of Clarksburg, who achieved the rank of Lt.-General before his death in 1863. In 1861 he had requested assignment to western Virginia, which he described as "bleeding at every pore", but was refused and remained stationed in the Shenandoah Valley. His brigade contained thirteen companies of West Virginia volunteers.

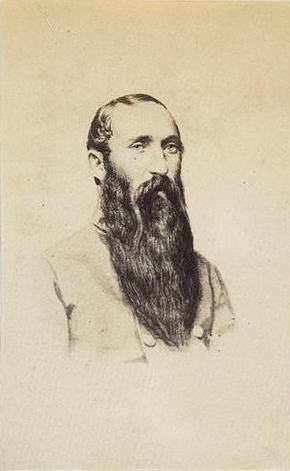
Brig. Gen. Albert Gallatin Jenkins

Generals Albert G. Jenkins of Cabell County and William Lowther Jackson of Wood County were frequently engaged in actions within the state, raiding behind Union lines for material and recruits. Jenkins was killed at the Battle of Cloyd's Mountain in 1864. John McCausland of Mason County became notorious in the north for his actions in Chambersburg, Pa., which resulted in the burning of the town in 1864. John Echols of Monroe County became a Lt. Col. and was placed in command of the 27th Virginia Infantry, half of whose men came from West Virginia. Later, as a brigadier-general, he would be placed in command of a brigade which included many West Virginia volunteers. Edwin Gray Lee of Jefferson County, a cousin of Robert E. Lee, served on the staff of Stonewall Jackson before becoming Lt.-Col. of the 33rd Virginia Infantry. In 1864 he was promoted to brig-general, but left the service due to ill-health soon after.

Other notable military figures were Christopher Q. Tompkins and George S. Patton of Charleston, who were instrumental in the organizing of volunteers in the Kanawha Valley in the summer of 1861. Tompkins resigned from the service in frustration at the chaos caused by generals Floyd and Wise, and Patton was killed at the Third Battle of Winchester in 1864. Angus W. McDonald of Hampshire County became colonel of the 7th Virginia Cavalry defending the bridges of the Potomac River. He also organized the first topographic corps in Virginia. Lt. Col. Vincent A. Witcher of Wayne County was a wide-ranging cavalry officer, moving from West Virginia through Tennessee and participating in the Battle of Gettysburg in 1863 and later at Lynchburg in 1864 during Union Brig-Gen. David Hunter's failed campaign. Lynchburg residents credited the actions of Brig. Gen. John McCausland with saving the city and presented him with a gold sword. Hanse McNeill led a company of Rangers out of Hardy County which operated in the lower Shenandoah Valley, though they also participated in operations around the Gettysburg campaign. After McNeill's death in 1864 his son Jesse took command and achieved fame in a covert operation that resulted in the capture of two Union generals well behind Union lines and sending them as prisoners to Richmond in 1865.

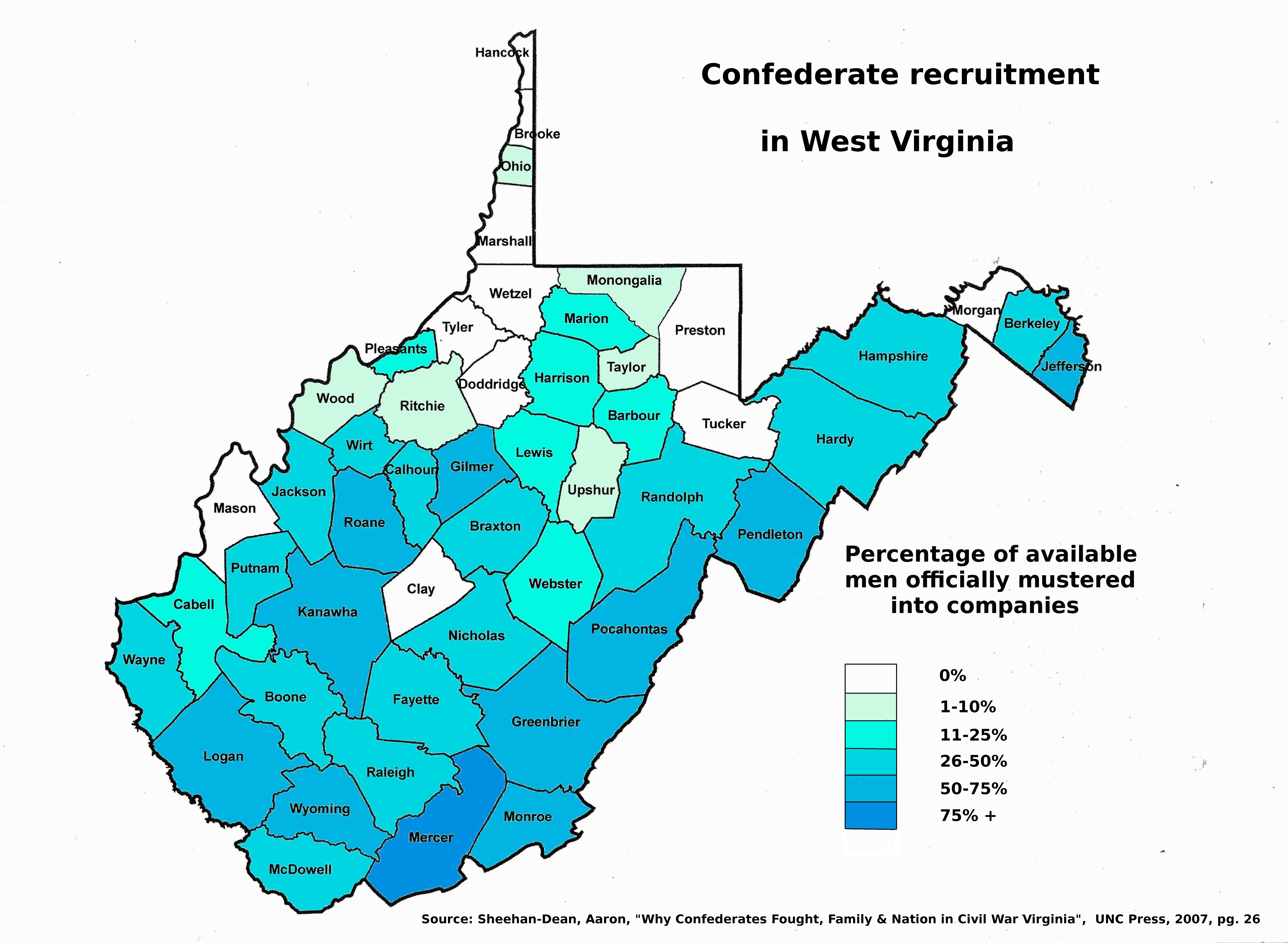
Confederate recruitment in West Virginia

Large numbers of West Virginia recruits were under the command of John Imboden of Augusta County, Va., which operated in West Virginia and was also part of Lee's Gettysburg campaign; the 18th Virginia Cavalry, the 62nd Virginia Mounted Infantry, four companies of the 25th Virginia Infantry and McLanahan's Battery, with McNeill's Rangers attached to his command.

West Virginia volunteers contributed notably or significantly to thirteen infantry regiments, three infantry battalions, one mounted infantry battalion, a sharpshooter battalion, twelve artillery batteries, fifteen cavalry regiments, six cavalry battalions, and a company of partisan rangers, while some served in Kentucky Confederate regiments. Altogether 20–22,000 West Virginians were in Confederate service.

=== Political ===
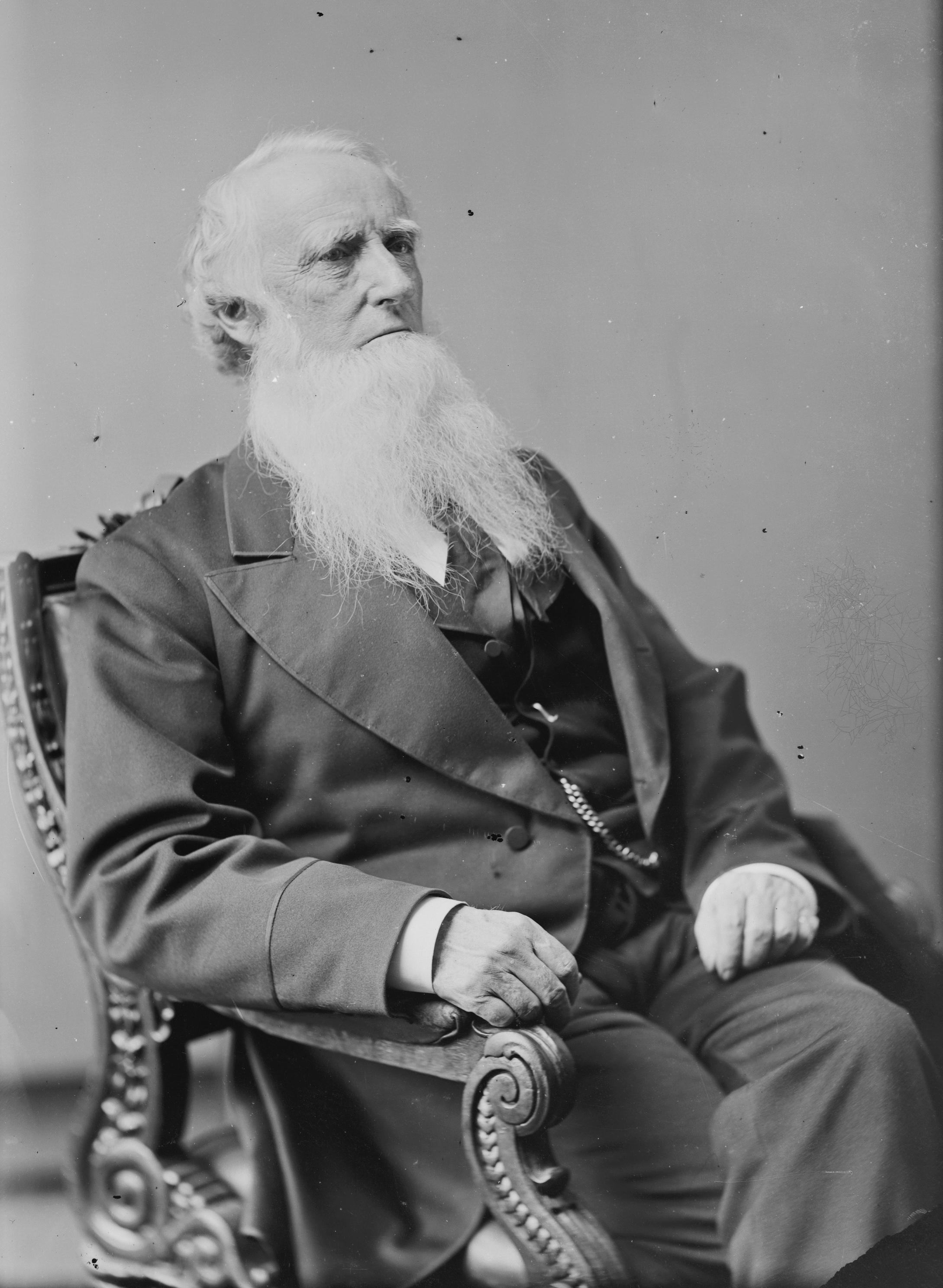
Allen T. Caperton – Confederate senator

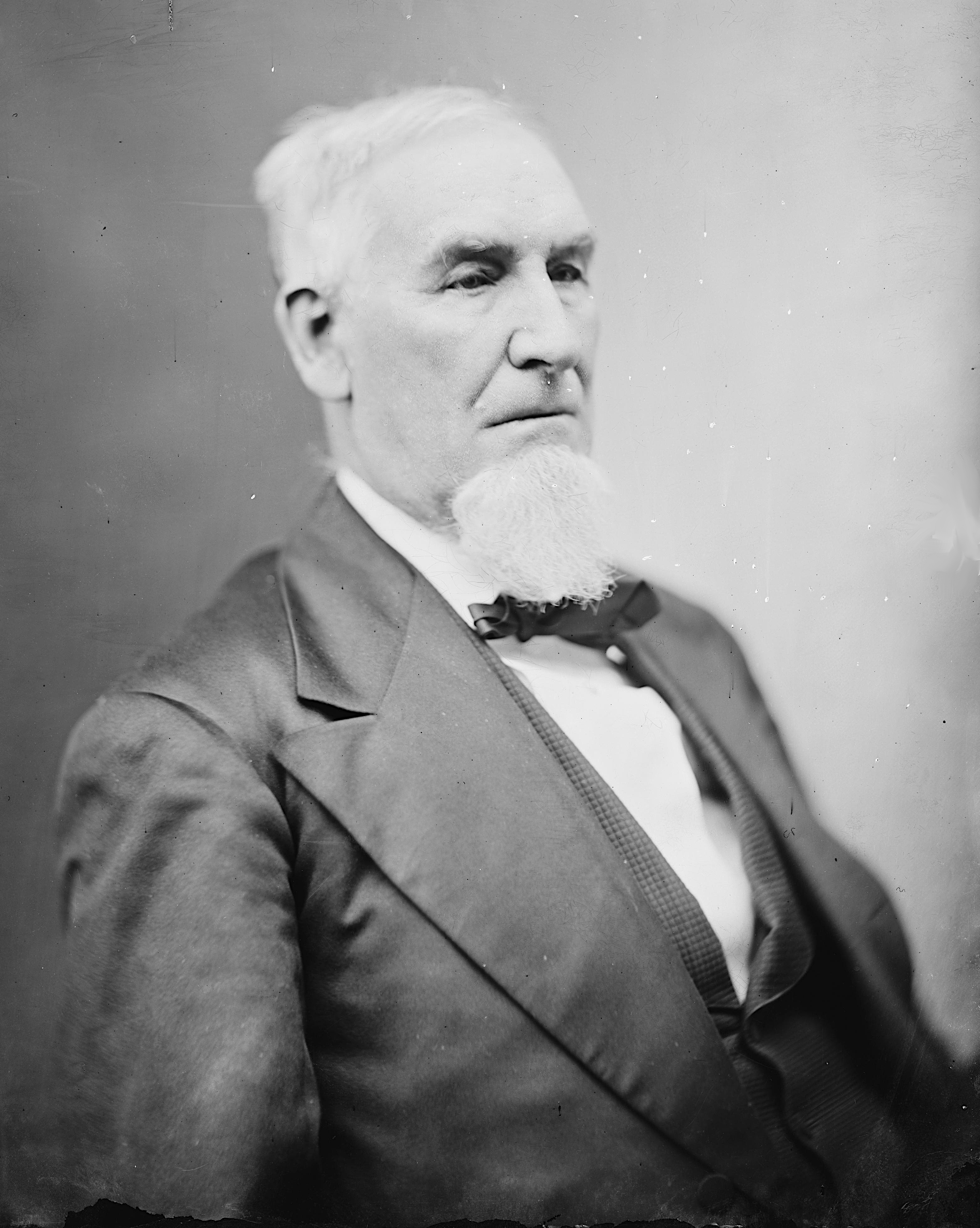
Samuel Price, Lt.-Gov. of Virginia

After the Richmond convention passed the secession ordinance on April 17, 1861, they appointed five delegates to the provisional congress of the Confederacy, which included Gideon D. Camden of Harrison County. Camden resigned from his post, however, as his home in Clarksburg was behind Union lines by June and his property was threatened if he assumed his seat in Montgomery. More delegates from West Virginia were appointed to represent Virginia; Charles Wells Russell, Robert Johnston, and Alexander Boteler. When Boteler was not in Richmond he was on the staff of Stonewall Jackson, with the rank of colonel, and after Jackson's death he was a member of the staff of J.E.B. Stuart. In Congress Boteler supported efforts to strengthen the central government, particularly in efforts to regain military control of his district which became part of the new state.

Albert G. Jenkins resigned his military commission to accept a seat in the Confederate congress, but resigned that post in April 1862 to resume his military activities. His position was filled by Samuel Augustine Miller of Kanawha County, who had been a major in the 22nd Virginia Infantry and won Jenkins' seat in a special election in 1863. In Congress he worked on the committee controlling army pay and clothing, and supported Lee's efforts to gain more authority in directing the war.

Robert Johnston, congressman from the 15th District, the counties of north-central West Virginia, was supportive of a strong central government and supported Jefferson Davis' authority in reorganizing the army, and believed the suspension of habeas corpus by Davis was justifiable.

Charles Wells Russell was a "refugee" Congressman in the Confederate legislature, as the counties he served were almost all under Federal occupation in the first days of the war. He was described as a "pillar of the administration" by a colleague. He was very active on the committees of Naval Affairs and the Judiciary. He eventually became a supporter of the draft and opposed class exemptions, and also supported using slaves in the army.

Allen T. Caperton of Monroe County became a Confederate senator for Virginia and remained in that position to the end of the war. He opposed a centralized government and fought for greater local control. He later became a U.S. senator for West Virginia in 1874.

Samuel Price of Greenbrier County became Lt. Gov. of Virginia in 1864, and as such was president of the senate. He had expressed concern at the start of the war that little effort was being made by Richmond to defend western Virginia. Price was arrested by Col. George Crook (U.S.) in 1862 for refusing to take the oath of loyalty, but was rescued by Confederate forces when the Kanawha Valley was briefly recaptured.

Mason Mathews of Greenbrier County was a state senator during the war. He warned Jefferson Davis of the bitter feud between generals John Floyd and Henry Wise, which was hampering the defense of western Virginia. His son Henry was a major in the Confederate army, and later a governor of West Virginia.

At the end of the war President Lincoln asked that the Virginia legislature be reconvened. Samuel Price, as president of the senate, was issued a pass by Gen. Weitzel to return to Richmond for the new session. He met with other legislators in Staunton when news arrived that President Lincoln had been assassinated. He returned to his home, but on June 11, 1865, both he and Allen Caperton were arrested and taken to Charleston. They were later released and received presidential pardons, which was required for former officials of the Confederate government. One hundred and one West Virginians received these special pardons.

== Confederate postal service and currency ==
=== Postal service ===
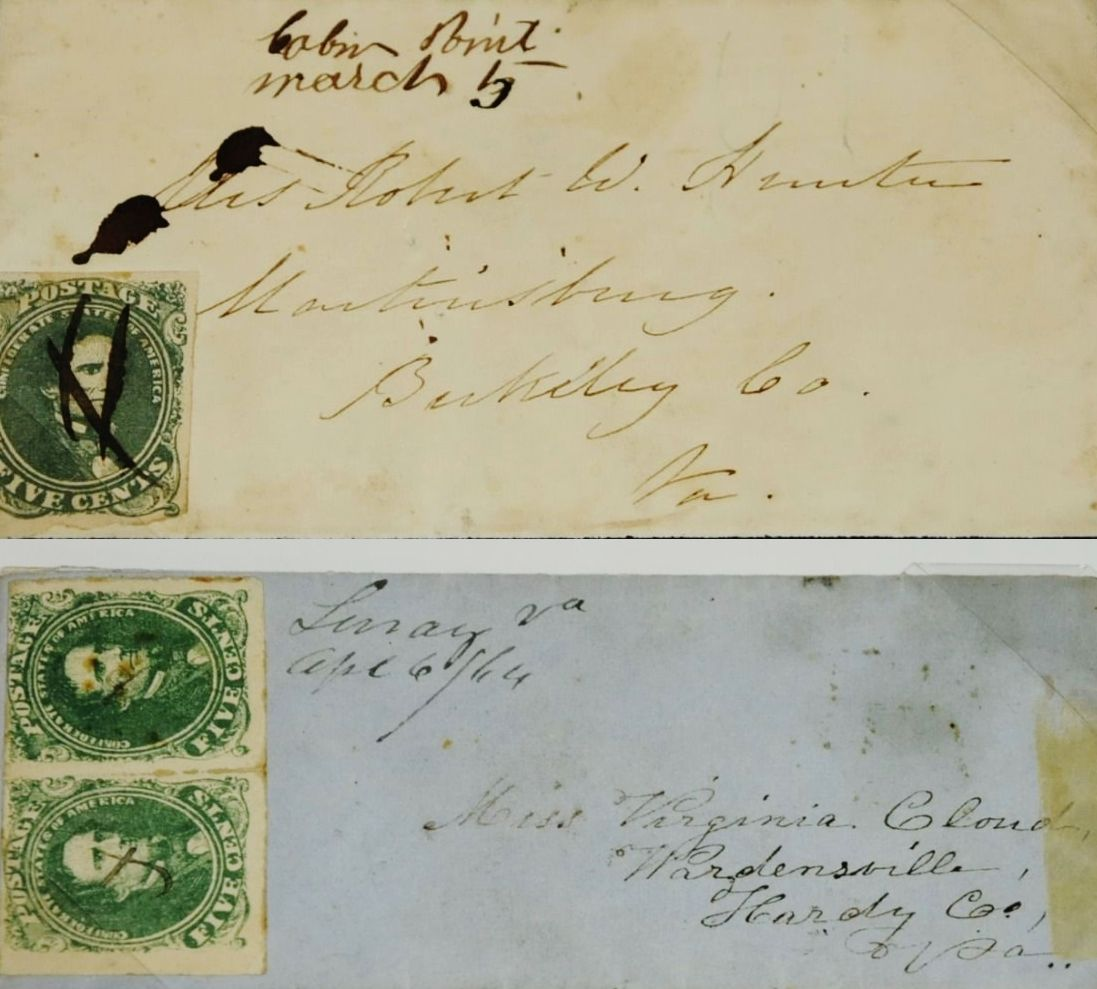
Two letters to West Virginia via Confederate postal system, the top letter to Robert W. Hunter in Martinsburg, the bottom letter to Hardy County

Confederate post offices in West Virginia basically followed the line of secessionist counties, running from Harpers Ferry in the eastern panhandle to southwest Virginia. The number of post offices has been estimated at a minimum of fifty, which included the towns of Shepherdstown, Martinsburg, Charles Town, Rippon, Moorefield, Franklin, Romney, Travellers Repose (now Bartow), Huntersville, White Sulphur Springs, Frankford, Lewisburg, Red Sulphur Springs, Salt Sulphur Springs, Union and Peterstown. Postal marks have also been found for Beverly, Charleston and Fayetteville. From June 1, 1861, to October 16, when the first official Confederate postage stamp was issued, the postmaster marked the letters "paid".

In Shepherdstown the Confederate postmaster general, John H. Reagan, appointed David Rentch postmaster, assisted by Jerome Dushane. When Rentch was captured by Union soldiers in Nov. 1862, the post office was closed. The postmasters in Charles Town and Harpers Ferry seemed to have served both sides. The longest serving postmaster was James A. Shanklin, postmaster in Union, Monroe County, who had been appointed in 1821, and served until 1865. Many post offices closed or opened depending upon which side held the territory. The office in Harpers Ferry closed in June 1861 when Confederate forces left the town and it never reopened.

In the post-war era President Andrew Johnson issued special pardons for ex-Confederates not covered by the general amnesty, such as members of the Confederate government, and five such special pardons were issued to West Virginians who were listed as "rebel postmaster".

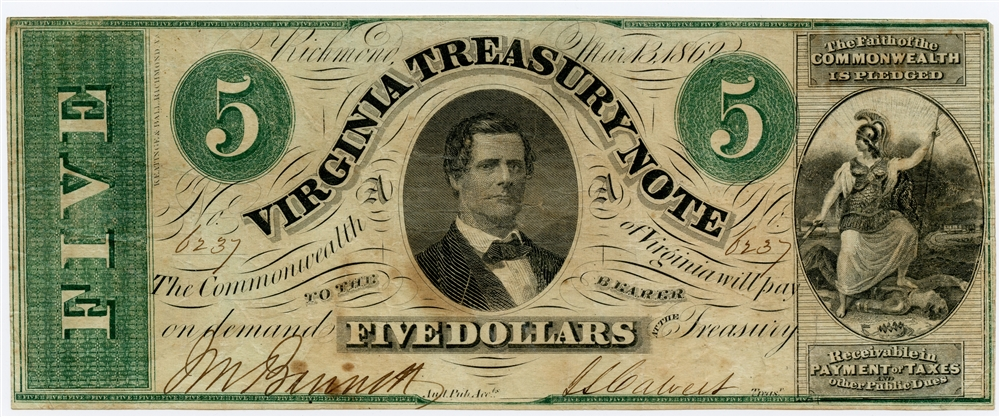
A five-dollar note issued by the state of Virginia in 1862 bearing a portrait of Jonathan M. Bennett, state auditor

A list of West Virginia civilians imprisoned at Camp Chase in March 1862 named five men as rebel mail carriers from Randolph, Pendleton, Hampshire, and Tucker counties. A Confederate mail service ran twice weekly from Tucker County to Monterey in 1861 Confederate mail left Parkersburg following a route from Limestone Hill, Mineral Wells, and Elizabeth to Big Bend and Arnoldsburg, Calhoun County. Delivery time from Parkersburg to Richmond was about 10 days. Occasionally Confederate mail would be slipped into the Federal mail system by sympathetic postmasters in Wood County for delivery further north, though suspicious mail was sometimes opened by Federal authorities, resulting in a jail term for the recipient. In central West Virginia the continuous guerrilla war disrupted both Union and Confederate postal service. Often mail would be carried informally through Union lines by women, who were less subject to search and inspection.

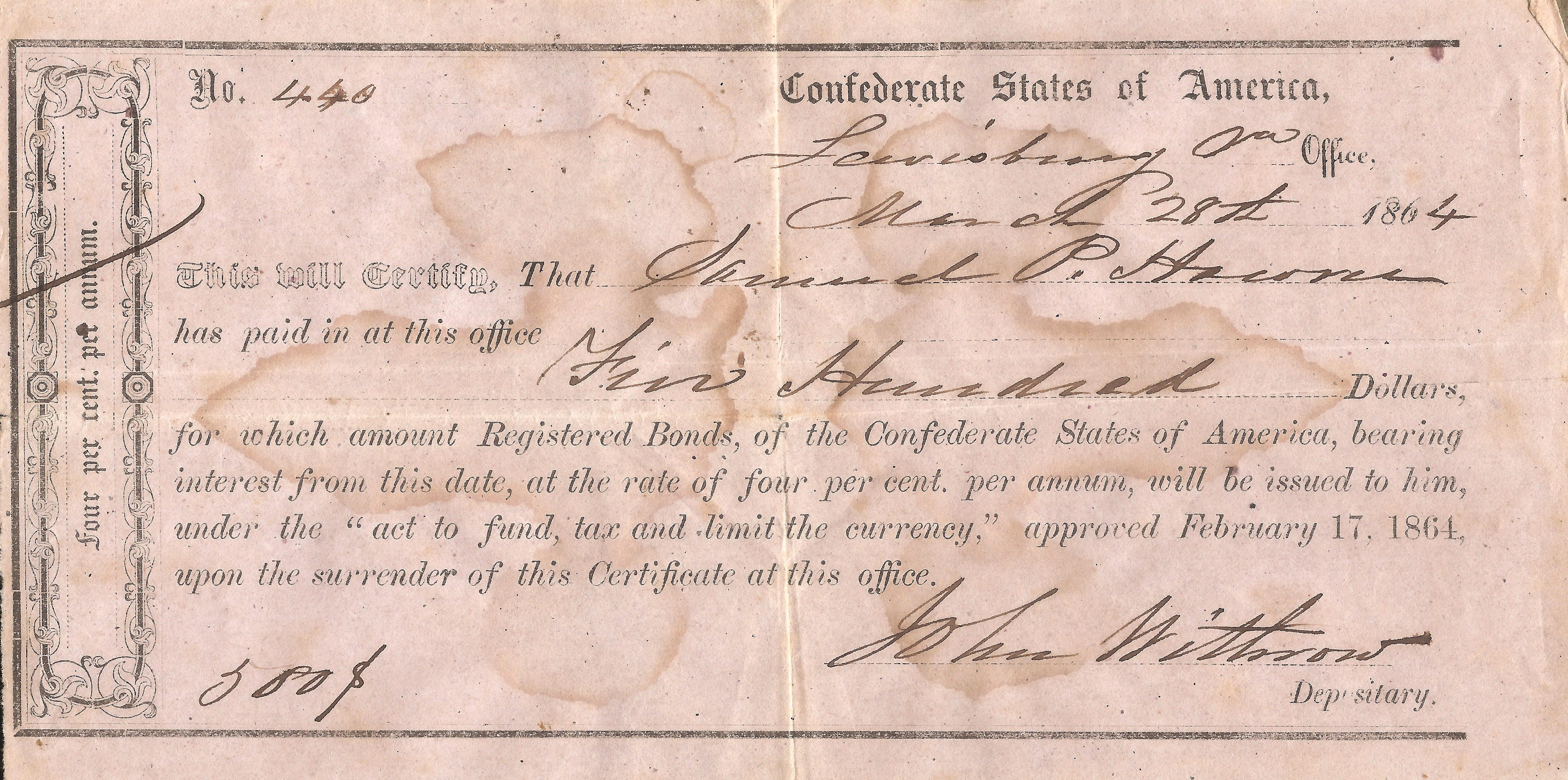
Confederate States of America, bond issued in 1864 to Samuel P. Hawver, Greenbrier County

=== Currency ===
Confederate currency was mostly used in the eastern and southern counties, somewhat less in the central counties. It was often used by Confederate officers to pay for goods taken during raids through Union-held territory. Many of the notes issued by Virginia during the war contained a portrait of Jonathan M. Bennett, the state auditor, and a native of Lewis County. Confederate bonds were also issued. The payrolls of West Virginia's Confederate soldiers would have provided much of the currency stock in the state.

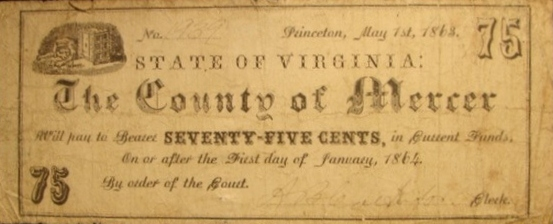
Mercer County, Virginia, paper currency, 75-cent denomination, 1863

In 1863 Dr. Thomas B. Camden, of Weston, Lewis County, sold his horse for $140 in Confederate currency prior to being imprisoned at Camp Chase with his wife and children. Legal cases involving the use of Confederate money to pay off debts, buying land, slaves and other financial transactions occupied West Virginia courts for many years. In 1873 the state legislature passed a bill that required Confederate money used in contracts between 1861 and 1865 to be based on the true value at the time of the contract. In areas where the Union army had gained control many merchants were reluctant to accept the money, as during Loring's occupation of Charleston.

By the beginning of the Civil War the Confederacy had just begun the issuance of a national currency. United States currency was still being used, and eventually Confederate paper currency was in production, but there was no coinage, although attempts had been made for its production. Local towns and cities in Virginia, such as Leesburg, began to issue their own paper scrip in small denominations in order to handle small daily transactions, though this scrip was not legal. On March 29, 1862, the General Assembly passed an act allowing counties, as well as towns with a population of 2,000 or more, to issue scrip for transactions under five dollars. Three cities with populations under 2,000 were specifically allowed to issue scrip, one of which was Lewisburg. The counties of Monroe, Greenbrier and Mercer also began to issue low value scrip.

== Prisoner exchange and civilians ==
=== Prisoner exchange ===
One of the functions of the Confederate government was intervention with the U.S. government for prisoner exchange. Large numbers of West Virginia citizens were imprisoned in Wheeling and especially Camp Chase in Columbus, Ohio. On October 25, 1861, the auditor of Virginia, Jonathan M. Bennett, wrote to Judah P. Benjamin, the Confederate Secretary of War, to urge him to make efforts to have the prisoners released or exchanged. An exchange program was initiated between the two governments, though it eventually ended several years later.

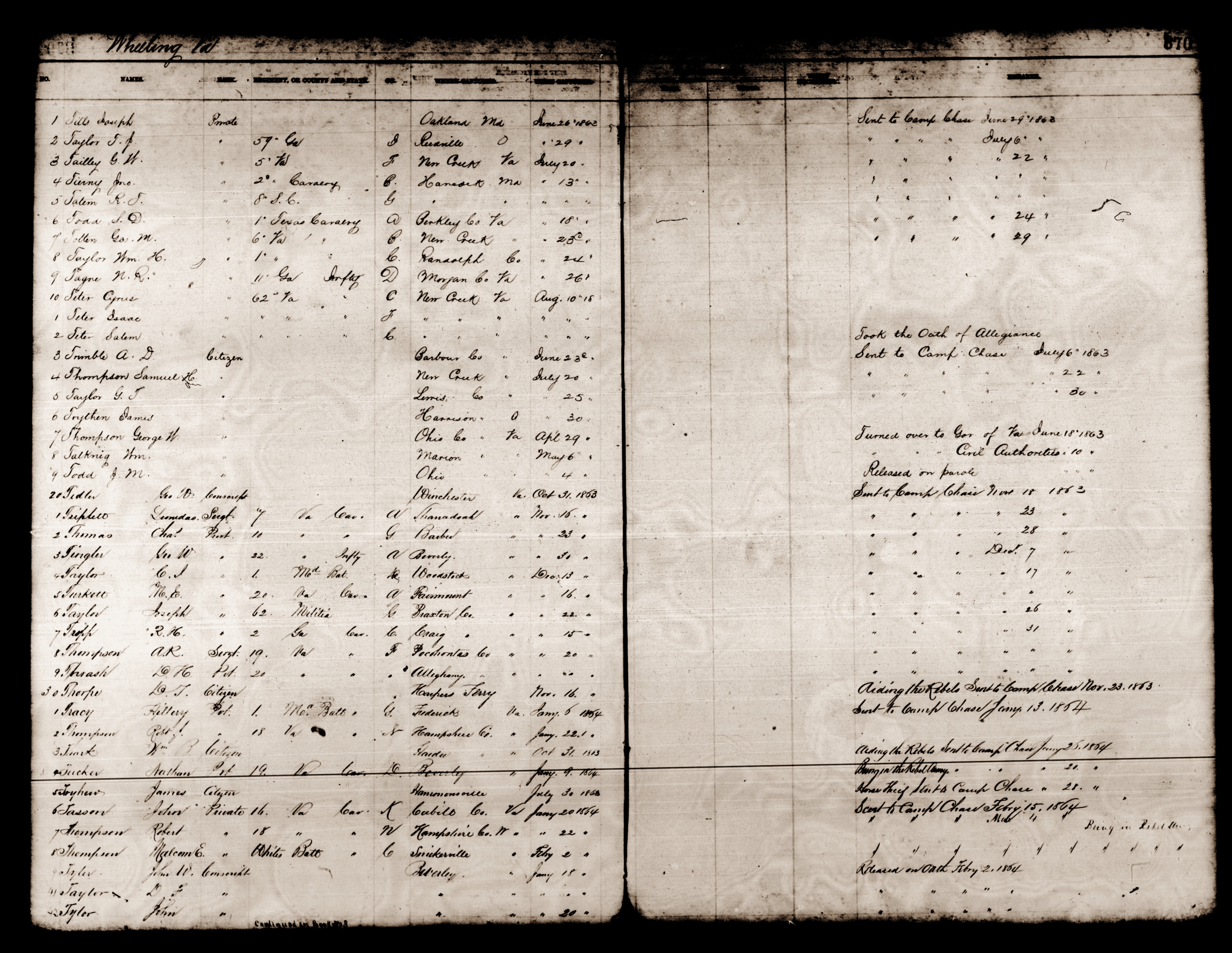
Prison records from the Atheneum prison in 1863 showing civilian prisoners, Judge Thompson's second arrest

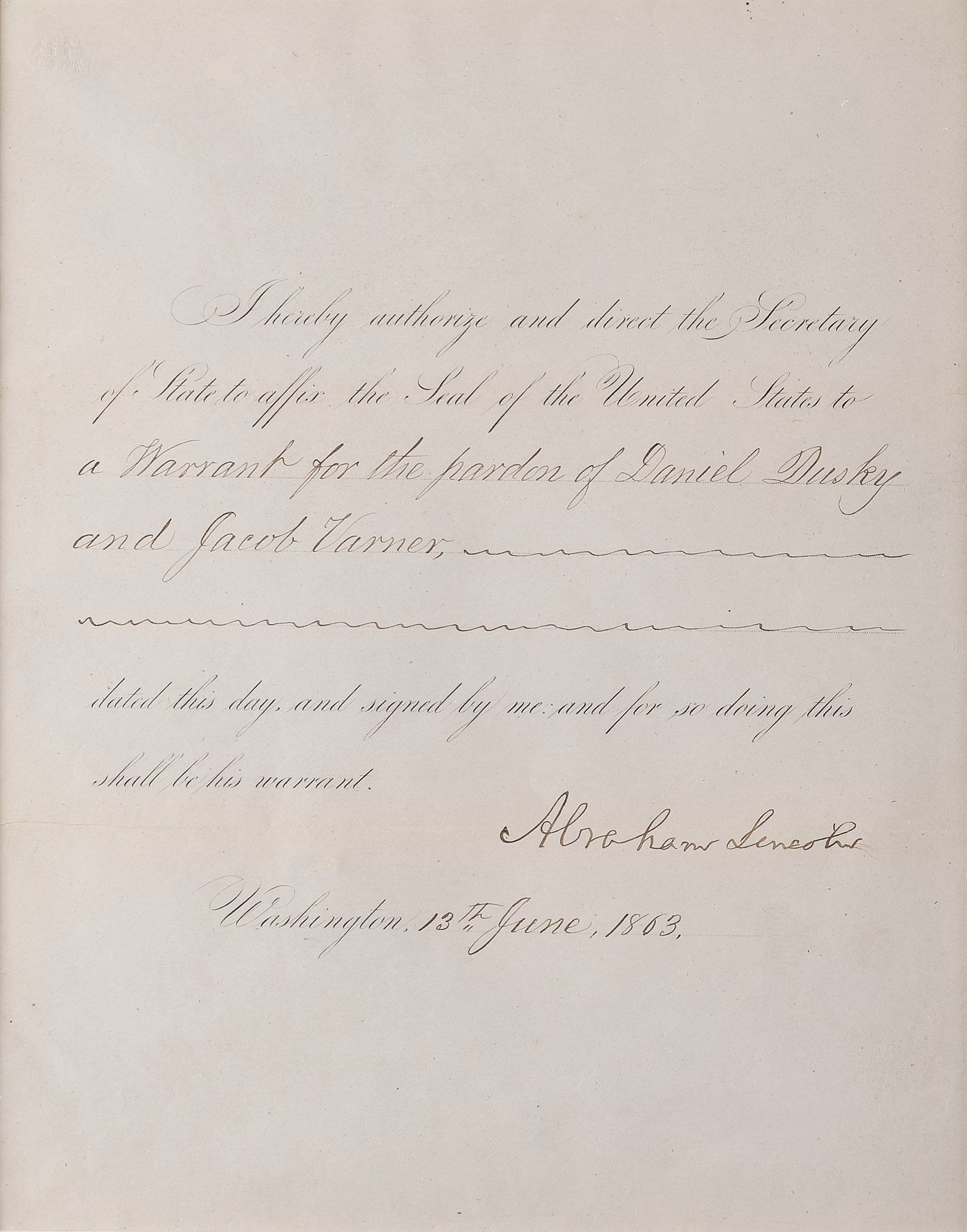
Lincoln's pardon for Daniel Dusky (Duskey) and Jacob Varner, June 13, 1863

Judge George W. Thompson of Virginia's 20th circuit court was described as the only loyal judge of the court by Francis H. Pierpont, who had helped organize a Unionist state government for Virginia in Wheeling. However, Judge Thompson believed that Pierpont's government was usurped and refused to take any oath that included the Pierpont government, which was called the "double oath" as it was not just to the Federal government but also to the Wheeling government. He was arrested on May 30, 1862, for refusing the oath and sent to Camp Chase and was released a few months later by prisoner exchange without taking the Wheeling oath. He returned to Wheeling but was arrested once again in 1863 because of the oath. Since Judge Thompson was exchanged by the Federal government this prompted several U.S. judge-advocates to question the legality of the arrest. Joseph Holt, the U.S. Judge-Advocate General, complained to the Secretary of War, Edwin Stanton, that Pierpont's extensive arrests were interfering with the prisoner exchange program.

Pierpont's administration arrested such a high number of civilians that it prompted U.S. judge-advocate Levi C. Turner to comment that they were doing a "land-office business...in the way of arrests."

In 1862 an investigation of conditions in Camp Chase, conducted for Col. William Hoffman, Commissary-General of Prisoners, by Capt. H.M. Lazelle, noted particularly the actions of Major Darr, the provost-marshall in Wheeling. Lazelle stated that Darr was "very zealous; perhaps too hasty and arbitrary." He went on to specify the circumstances of the West Virginia civilian prisoners:

"I have the official records of a number of prisoners sent here by him, seven of which state that the prisoner is charged with 'doing nothing'...Many others have been sent here under equally slight charges whose cases I will soon submit to you, at least copies of their official records as transmitted by him to Camp Chase, for I believe it cannot be your desire that this camp should be filled to overflowing with political prisoners (made by half depopulating a section of country where inhabitants are often compelled to expressions of apparent sympathy) arrested on frivolous charges, to be supported by the General Government and endure a long confinement."

In May 1862 Major Darr was preparing to arrest the Catholic bishop of Wheeling, Bishop Whelan, but was prevented from doing so by Secretary of War, Edwin M. Stanton, who instructed Darr-"The President being informed that you intend or threaten to arrest Bishop Whelan, the Catholic Bishop of your city, he directs that you take no action against the Bishop without the President's order."

On Dec. 19, 1862, Confederate rangers under the command of Capt. Daniel Duskey, raided the town of Ripley, Jackson County, where they captured a store of weapons and also seized the U.S. post office. Several weeks later they were captured in Calhoun County, but were treated as civilians rather than military personnel and were tried and convicted to a civilian prison rather than a military prison camp. Gov. John Letcher wrote to President Lincoln and reminded him that the men held military commissions from the Virginia government. On June 13, 1863, President Lincoln issued a pardon for the two men, who were exchanged for two Union prisoners held in Richmond.

Confederate authorities also arrested civilians for suspected disloyalty or collaboration. Historian Mark E. Neely found records of 337 men arrested in western Virginia, counties both in West Virginia and Virginia, who were held at Castle Thunder in Richmond for various offences, real or imagined, i.e., having voted against the secession ordinance, or Union soldiers camping on their property. Having voted against the secession ordinance, and living in contested counties in the west, "put a man at risk for military arrest by Confederate authorities." Civilians often found themselves as pawns between rival authorities. On Jan. 4, 1863, the Wheeling-elected sheriff of Barbour County was arrested by Imboden's troops and was sent to Richmond as a prisoner. In retaliation Gov. Pierpont arrested 8 citizens of Barbour to be held as hostages, one of whom died in prison. The sheriff and hostages were eventually released and Sheriff Trayhern resigned his position.

=== Civilians ===
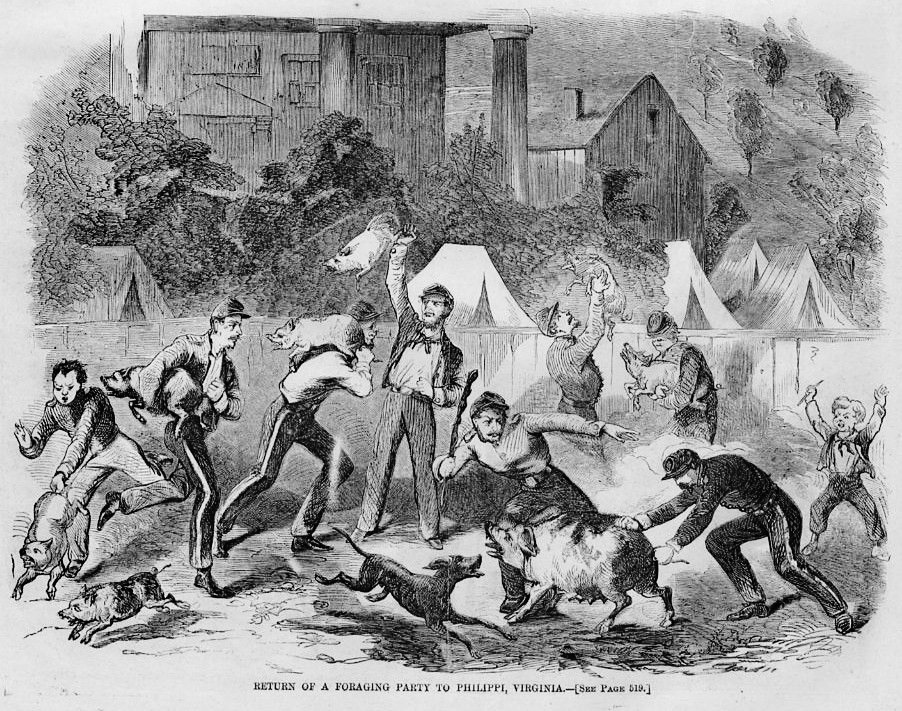
"Return of a Foraging Party to Philippi, Virginia", Harper s Weekly, August 17, 1861.

The first land battle of the war at Philippi, Barbour County, resulted in widescale looting and vandalism by Union troops. Although Brig. Gen. McClellan had promised that his troops would respect private property it was difficult to control them. McLellan left West Virginia and Gen. Rosecrans took command, and found that numerous claims for the destruction of private property were presented to him almost daily.

Gen. George Crook noted in his autobiography that he had to "burn out" the entire county of Webster. On Jan. 1, 1862 he led companies of the 36th Ohio to eradicate guerrillas. Capt. Warren Hollister wrote on Jan. 7- "...according to positive instructions I was to lay waste and destroy the county. This was an unpleasant but necessary part of the warfare. Consequently, for a distance of 16 miles there not a lot left...forage or habitable building, and as we ascended the mountain I could trace our path for miles by the cloud of black smoke that showed itself in the distance." Prisoners were often killed in the field. John C. Fremont took command of Union troops in West Virginia on April 6, 1862, and continued Crook's policy of hard war.

On March 29, 1862, Jefferson Davis placed the counties of Greenbrier, Pocahontas, Monroe, Mercer, Raleigh, Fayette, Nicholas, and Randolph under martial law, due to citizen complaints of marauding outlaws. Brig. Gen. Henry Heth, who had recently been placed in command of the area, was charged with enforcing the law, though it lasted for only a short time.

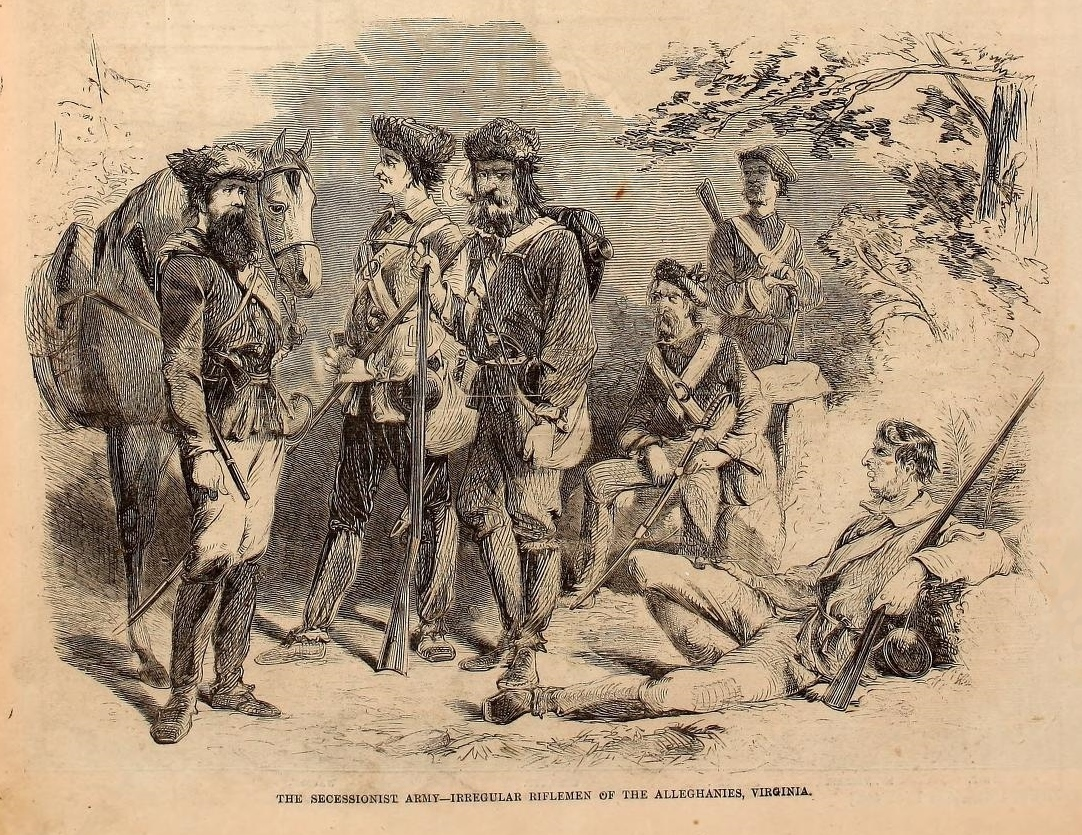
Western Virginia Confederate Irregulars, Harper's Weekly, July 29, 1861

Some guerrilla forces, ostensibly supporting the Confederacy, nevertheless resorted to brigandry and victimized civilians regardless of allegiances. Confederate general "Grumble" Jones was accused of similar thefts during the Jones-Imboden raid of 1863, causing indignation for the West Virginia soldiers in the raid.

On Nov. 27, 1862, Brig. Gen. Robert H. Milroy ordered fines to be levied against civilians to compensate for rebel raids and horse stealing, with threats of fire and execution. Brig. Gen. John Imboden informed Jefferson Davis, and protest was formally made to Maj. Gen. Halleck, who sent word that ..."Milroy had no authority to issue these orders, which are deemed in violation of the laws of war." By the time Halleck's orders reached Milroy over $6000 had been taken, though eventually reimbursed.

Sometimes civilians were forced to relocate behind Confederate lines. After the Jones-Imboden raid in May 1863 families were evicted from their homes in Weston by Brig. Gen. Benjamin S. Roberts to relocate further south while others, such as Dr. Thomas B. Camden, were sent to Camp Chase prison with their families.

The extent of control exercised by Union and Confederate forces is hard to determine. In August 1861 McClellan ordered Gen. Rosecrans to concentrate on turnpikes and the railroad and ignore the interior "for the present". The counties around the B&O railroad west of Tucker County were occupied by the Union, as well as most of the counties along the Ohio border. They also held Charleston and the waterways along the Kanawha Valley. Confederate forces held tentatively to southern West Virginia and the eastern counties until the end of the war. Col. Vincent A. Witcher reported from Logan Courthouse on Nov. 15, 1864, that he had recruited 6 full companies and 5 incomplete companies in Logan and Wyoming counties.

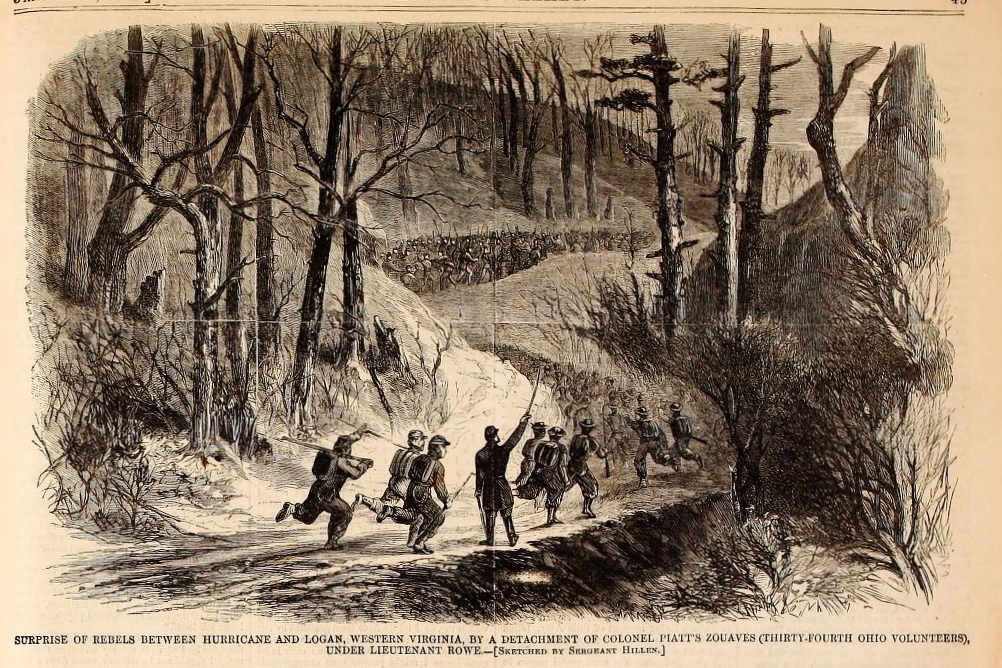
34th Ohio Infantry attacking Confederate soldiers in Logan County, Harper's Weekly, Jan. 18, 1862

Raids and counter-raids were the rule from 1862 to 1865 with a continuing guerrilla war in a large part of the state. In 1863 the future governor of the new state, Arthur I. Boreman, said- "After you get a short distance below the Panhandle...it is not safe for a loyal man to go into the interior out of sight of the Ohio River." The ease with which the Jones-Imboden Raid was conducted in 1863 frustrated Maj. Gen. Halleck. In June 1864 Gov. Boreman asked Gen. David Hunter to exert his forces in the southwestern counties- "The counties between the Great Kanawha and Big Sandy Rivers, in the southern part of the State, have been infested with large bodies of guerrillas from the beginning of the rebellion..."

After the capture of Union General Scammon and his men an Ohio newspaper was prompted to write on Feb, 18, 1864–

"With the commanding General of the Department and his Quarter Master, in Libby prison, captured by rebels within 35 miles of Gallipolis- a government steamer burned at the same time, it might seem to an unpracticed eye, that the State of West Virginia was not so intensely loyal as some persons wish it to be considered. The fact is that region of country is just as well stocked with rebels both armed and unarmed as any other portion of the South."

At the end of the war over 5,000 Confederate soldiers were paroled at Charleston, and many West Virginians received paroles at Appomattox with the surrender of the Army of Northern Virginia. West Virginians were granted the same parole conditions as soldiers from the 11 Confederate states, while soldiers from Kentucky, Missouri and Maryland were excluded and had to seek paroles from the War Office.

Troubles continued in the state after Lee's surrender, guerrillas such as "Rebel Bill" Smith continued to disregard the peace, while Union soldiers were called out to deal with public disturbances through 1868 and finally left the state in 1869.

== General Assembly 1861–1865 ==
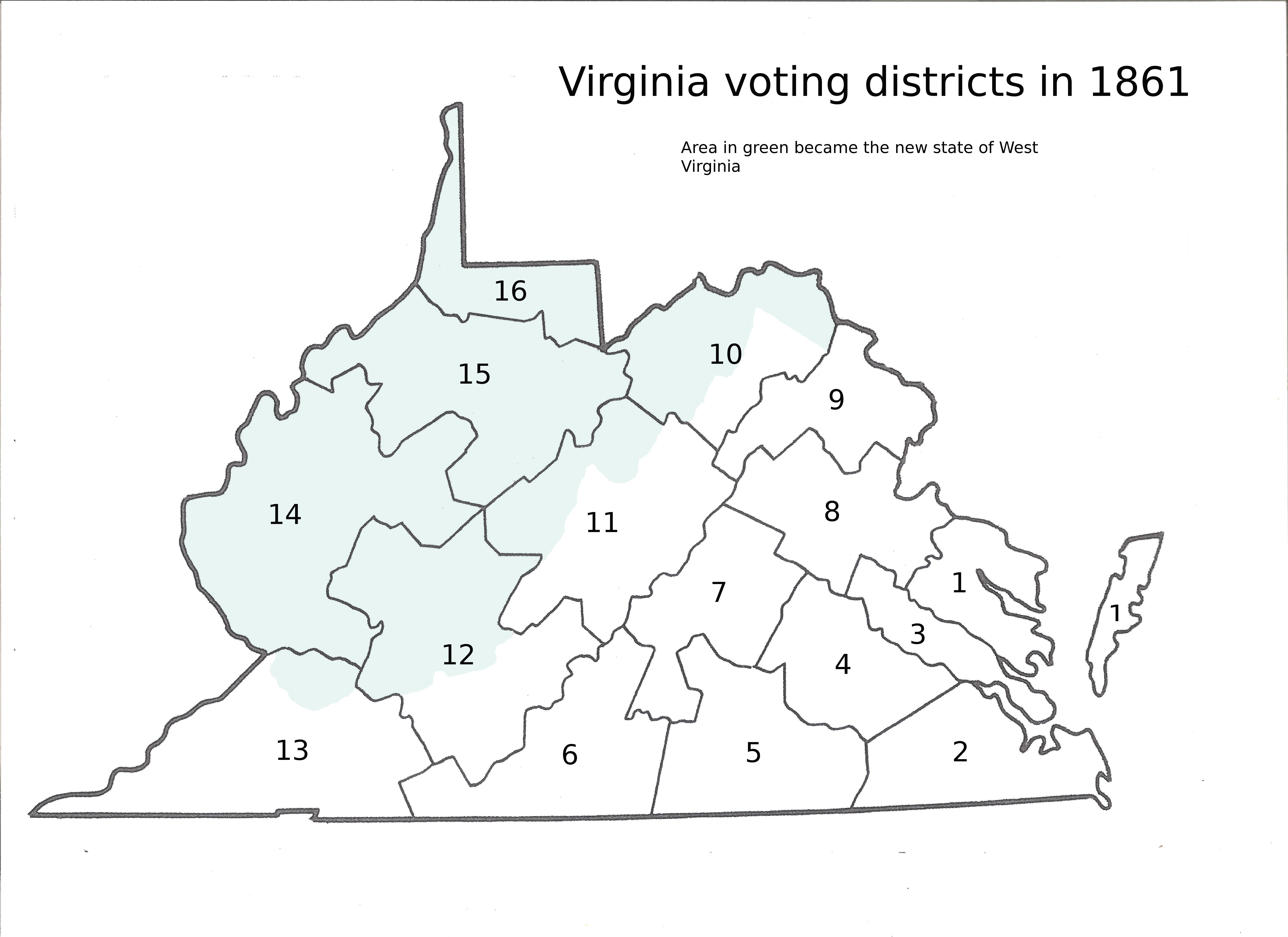
Virginia's 16 voting districts

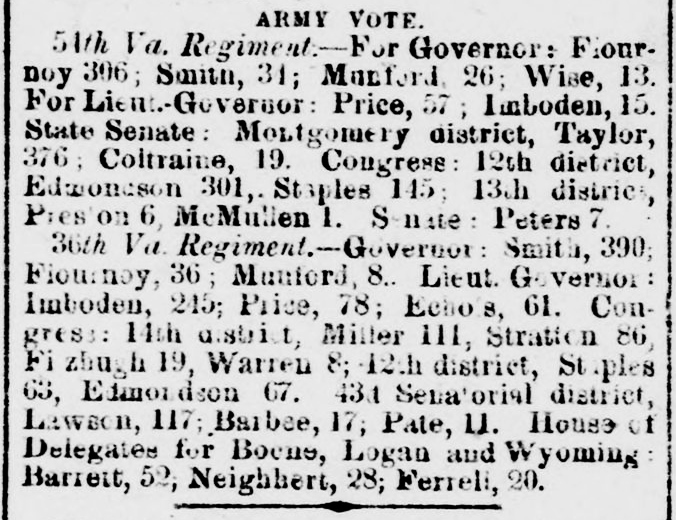
Vote results for 54th and 36th Virginia Infantry for governor, May 28, 1863. The 36th Virginia Infantry was primarily recruited in West Virginia

A number of senators and house delegates elected to represent West Virginia counties decided to remain loyal to Virginia and the Richmond government. The table for 1861–1863 lists these delegates and senators. The map shows the voting districts of Virginia, with the shaded section showing the area that became West Virginia. The county composition of those districts is as follows: District 10 includes Berkeley, Morgan, Hampshire, Jefferson and Hardy. District 11 includes Pendleton and Pocahontas. District 12 includes Mercer, Monroe, Greenbrier, Raleigh and Fayette. District 13 includes only McDowell. District 14 consists of Kanawha, Logan, Boone, Wayne, Cabell, Putnam, Mason, Jackson, Roane, Clay, Nicholas, Braxton, Wirt and Wyoming. District 15 consists of Lewis, Wood, Pleasants, Tyler, Ritchie, Doddridge, Upshur, Randolph, Webster, Tucker, Barbour, Harrison, Taylor, Gilmer and Calhoun. District 16 consists of Ohio, Hancock, Brooke, Marshall, Wetzel, Marion, Monongalia and Preston. Each district was entitled to choose one representative in the Congress of the Confederate States. Results for Virginia's Confederate congressional elections from Nov. 6, 1861, have not been located, the only returns found are full returns for District 3, and partial returns for District 8.

In 1863 voting for the Virginia legislature in Richmond was hampered by the war and the refugee status of many voters. Virginians were allowed to vote outside of their original resident counties but had to vote at the county courthouse and not at local polling stations. Voting by soldiers was done within the regimental organization.

The following table shows voting results, some only partial, for the Confederate congressional elections on May 28, 1863.

District	Candidate	Vote (* partial)
10	Frederick W.M. Holliday Alexander R. Boteler	1632 643
11	John B. Baldwin John Letcher	2590* 1398*
12	Waller R. Staples H.A. Edmonson	1000* 876*
13	Fayette McMullen Walter Preston	1594* 935*
14	Samuel A. Miller William Stratton Henry Fitzhugh J.D. Warren Scattering	740 604 481 211 2
15	Robert W. Johnston (unopposed)	709
16	Charles W. Russell Zedekiah Kidwell	129 104

Records for the Confederate elections are sparse, only nine counties of West Virginia have a recorded civilian vote for the May 28, 1863 election; Logan 200, Greenbrier 318, Hampshire 32, Hardy 132, Mercer 213, Monroe 421, Pocahontas 213, Raleigh 108 and Pendleton 171. Morgan County was also reported to have voted but no returns were given.

The following tables show delegates and senators representing West Virginia counties during the Civil War in the General Assembly of Virginia from 1861 to 1865.

General Assembly 1861–63
County/Counties	Name	Delegate/Senator
Barbour	Johnson, William	Delegate
Berkeley	Robinson, Israel	Delegate
Berkeley	Small, Adam	Delegate
Braxton, Nicholas, Clay	McLaughlin, Duncan	Delegate
Cabell	Laidley, Albert	Delegate
Fayette, Raleigh	Coleman, John J.	Delegate
Greenbrier	Mathews, Mason	Delegate
Hampshire	McDonald, Angus W., Jr.	Delegate
Hampshire	Blue, Charles	Delegate
Hardy	Williams, Charles	Delegate
Jefferson	Green, Thomas C.	Delegate
Jefferson	Hunter, Andrew	Delegate
Kanawha	Welch, Isaiah A.	Delegate
Logan, Boone, Wyoming	McDonald, Isaac E.	Delegate
Mercer	Richardson, Robert A.	Delegate
Monroe	Lively, Wilson	Delegate
Monroe	Rowan, John M.	Delegate
Pendleton	Boggs, James, resigned; R.B. Dice	Delegate
Pocahontas	Lockridge, James T.	Delegate
Preston	Cowan, R.E.	Delegate
Hampshire, Hardy, Morgan	Armstrong, James D.	Senator. Class 1
Mercer, Monroe, McDowell	Witten, James W.M.	Senator. Class 1. Also represented Giles, Tazewell, Bland and Buchanan, Va.
Greenbrier, Fayette, Raleigh, Nicholas, Braxton, Pocahontas, Clay, Webster	Alderson, Joseph A.	Senator. Class 1
Lewis, Barbour, Upshur, Gilmer, Randolph, Tucker, Webster	Brannon, John	Senator. Class 1
Jefferson, Berkeley	Isbell, Thomas M.	Senator. Class 2
Pendleton	Pennybacker, John D.	Senator. Class 2. Also represented Rockingham, Va.
Kanawha, Boone, Logan, Putnam, Wyoming, Roane, Calhoun	Pate, William D.	Senator. Class 2
Jackson, Mason, Cabell, Wayne, Wirt	Newman, William W.	Senator. Class 2
Wetzel, Marshall, Marion, Tyler	Neeson, James	Senator. Class 2
Monongalia, Preston, Taylor	Newlon, Charles W.	Senator. Class 2

General Assembly 1863–65
County/Counties	Name	Delegate/Senator
Barbour	Johnson, William	Delegate
Berkeley	Hunter, Robert W.	Delegate
Berkeley	Robinson, Israel; succeeded by William B. Colston	Delegate
Braxton, Nicholas, Clay, Webster	Haymond, Luther D.	Delegate
Brooke, Hancock	White, N.W.	Delegate
Cabell	Buffington, P.C.	Delegate
Doddridge, Tyler	McMillan, Samuel J.	Delegate
Fayette, Raleigh	Linkous, Benjamin R.	Delegate
Gilmer, Wirt, Calhoun	McCutcheon, J.S.K.	Delegate
Greenbrier	Mathews, Mason	Delegate
Hampshire	Monroe, Alexander	Delegate
Hampshire	Hiett, J.S.	Delegate
Hardy	Williams, Charles	Delegate
Harrison	Lurty, George W., resigned; succeeded by Andrew Radcliff	Delegate
Harrison	Holden, L.W.	Delegate
Jackson, Roane	Duval, George W.	Delegate
Jefferson	Melvin, Jacob S.	Delegate
Jefferson	Burnett, W.	Delegate
Kanawha	Welch, Isaiah A.	Delegate
Kanawha	Hendrick, V.	Delegate
Logan, Boone, Wyoming	Nighbert, James A.	Delegate
McDowell	Bowen, Rees T.	Delegate. Also represented Buchanan and Tazewell Counties, Virginia
Marion	Haymond, Thomas S.	Delegate
Marion	Morgan, Stephen A.	Delegate
Marshall	Hoge, James M.	Delegate
Mason	Hutcheson, James	Delegate
Mercer	Richardson, Robert A.	Delegate
Monongalia	Evans, Dudley	Delegate
Monongalia	Stewart, D.B.	Delegate
Monroe	Lively, Wilson	Delegate
Monroe	Rowan, John M.	Delegate
Morgan	Sherrard, George W.	Delegate
Ohio	Pendleton, Joseph H.	Delegate
Ohio	Edwards, Thomas A.	Delegate
Ohio	Hughes, Alfred	Delegate
Pendleton	Saunders, E.T.	Delegate
Pleasants, Ritchie	Tibbs, Eugenius	Delegate
Pocahontas	McNeil, William L.	Delegate
Preston	Cowan, Robert E.	Delegate
Preston	Cresap, C.J.P.	Delegate
Putnam	Herndon, William E.	Delegate
Randolph, Tucker	Crawford, B.W.	Delegate
Taylor	Robinson, John A.	Delegate
Upshur	Woodley, Willis H.	Delegate
Wayne	Ferguson, J.M.	Delegate
Wetzel	Hall, L.S.	Delegate
Wood	Maguire, E.D.	Delegate
Hampshire, Hardy, Morgan	Armstrong, James D.	Senator. Class 1
Mercer, Monroe, McDowell	Witten, James W.M.	Senator. Class 1. Also represented Giles, Tazewell and part of Bland, Va.
Greenbrier, Fayette, Raleigh, Nicholas, Braxton, Pocahontas, Clay, part of Webster	Alderson, Joseph A.	Senator. Class 1
Wood, Ritchie, Doddridge, Pleasants, Harrison	Stephenson, Kenner B.	Senator. Class 1
Lewis, Barbour, Upshur, Gilmer, Randolph, Tucker, part of Webster	Brannon, John	Senator. Class 1
Ohio, Brooke, Hancock	Shriver, Daniel M.	Senator. Class 1
Jefferson, Berkeley	Hunter, Andrew; succeeded by Edwin L. Moore	Senator. Class 2
Pendleton	Coffman, Samuel A.	Senator. Class 2. Also represented Rockingham, Va.
Kanawha, Boone, Logan, Putnam, Wyoming, Roane, Calhoun	Lawson, James M.	Senator. Class 2
Jackson, Mason, Cabell, Wayne, Wirt	Newman, William W.	Senator. Class 2
Wetzel, Marshall, Marion, Tyler	Neeson, James	Senator. Class 2
Monongalia, Preston, Taylor	Newlon, Charles W.	Senator. Class 2

== See also ==
- Confederate government of Kentucky
- Confederate government of Missouri
- Virginia in the American Civil War
- West Virginia in the American Civil War
- Confederate States of America
- American Civil War
- Wheeling Convention
- Restored Government of Virginia
