= Battle of New Market order of battle: Confederate =

The following Confederate States Army units and commanders fought in the Battle of New Market in the American Civil War. The Union order of battle is shown separately.

== Abbreviations used ==
=== Military rank ===
- MG = Major general
- BG = Brigadier general
- Col = Colonel
- Ltc = Lieutenant colonel
- Maj = Major
- Cpt = Captain
- Lt = Lieutenant

=== Other ===
- (w) = wounded
- (mw) = mortally wounded
- (k) = killed in action
- (c) = captured

== Department of Western Virginia ==
MG John C. Breckinridge, commanding

Division	Brigade	Regiments and others
Infantry Division (3057 men)	1st Brigade (1499 men) BG John Echols	22nd Virginia (550 men): Col George S. Patton, Sr.; 23rd Virginia Infantry Battalion (472 men): Ltc Clarence Derrick; 26th Virginia Infantry Battalion (477 men): Ltc George M. Edgar
Infantry Division (3057 men)	2nd Brigade (1558 men) BG Gabriel C. Wharton	51st Virginia (680 men): Ltc John P. Wolfe; 62nd Virginia Mounted Infantry (dismounted) (510 men): Col George H. Smith; 30th Virginia Battalion Sharpshooters (306 men): Ltc J. Lyle Clark; 1st Missouri Cavalry, Company A (dismounted) (62 men): Cpt Charles H. Woodson
Unattached	Attached commands (797 men)	Hart's Engineer Company (44 men): Cpt William T. Hart; Augusta-Rockingham Reserves (500 men): Col William Harman; Davis' Company Maryland Cavalry (26 men): Cpt T. Sturgis Davis; V.M.I. Cadets (227 men): Ltc Scott Ship
Unattached	Cavalry (1102 men) BG John D. Imboden	18th Virginia (600 men): Col George W. Imboden; 23rd Virginia (315 men): Col Robert White; 43rd Virginia Battalion Partisans: Ltc John S. Mosby; 2nd Maryland Battalion (40 men): Maj Harry W. Gilmor; McNeill's Company, Partisans (60 men): Cpt John H. McNeill; Company A, 3rd Battalion Virginia Mounted Reserves (87 men): Capt. George Chrisman
Unattached	Artillery (357 men, 18 guns) Maj William McLaughlin	Chapman's (Virginia) Battery (135 men, 6 guns): Cpt George B. Chapman; Jackson's (Virginia) Battery (94 men, 4 guns): 1st Lt Randolph H. Blain; McClanahan's (Virginia) Battery (93 men, 6 guns): Cpt John McClanahan; V.M.I section (35 men, 2 guns): Cadet Cpt C. H. Minge
