= Jones–Imboden Raid =

American Civil War battle

Coordinates: 38°28.532′N 79°41.952′W

The Jones-Imboden Raid
- Part of the American Civil War
Date	April – May, 1863
Location	Western Virginia (present day West Virginia) western Maryland
Result	Confederate victory

Belligerents
United States of America	Confederate States of America

Commanders and leaders
Robert C. Schenck; Benjamin S. Roberts	William E. Jones; John D. Imboden

Strength
45,000 (Total Middle Military Department)	7,000

Casualties and losses
Livestock driven off 1,000 head of cattle 1,200 horses Resources destroyed 16 rail bridges 150,000 barrels of oil Human casualties 700 prisoners 30 killed	unknown

The Jones–Imboden Raid was a Confederate military action conducted in western Virginia (now the state of West Virginia) in April and May 1863 during the American Civil War. The raid, led by Brig. Gens. William E. Jones and John D. Imboden, was aimed at disrupting traffic on the vital Baltimore and Ohio Railroad and reasserting Confederate authority in transmountain Virginia in an effort to derail the growing statehood movement in the region, since voters had in March approved a new Constitution and statehood only awaited Congressional and Presidential approval, which took place before the raid began. President Lincoln issued the statehood proclamation on April 20, 1863.

Raiders claimed success from a military vantage, since they severely damaged several railroad bridges (though not the two most critical), as well as an oil field and other critical Union resources. Raiders also captured valuable supplies and gained recruits. From a political standpoint, however, the raid failed, for it had little effect on pro-statehood sentiment, and West Virginia was admitted as the 35th state of the Union in June.

== Background ==
The raid was first proposed by John Hanson McNeill of McNeill's Rangers. He planned to destroy at least one important bridge of the Baltimore and Ohio (B&O) Railroad, which was vital to the Union supply lines through western Virginia. McNeill's idea was expanded into a two-prong attack. While Gen. William E. "Grumble" Jones attacked the B&O between Grafton (West) Virginia and Oakland, Maryland, Gen. John D. Imboden would attack Union garrisons at Beverly, Philippi, and Buckhannon. Raiders wanted to secure supplies, disrupt the B&O Railroad, raise recruits and, if possible, cripple the Unionist government in Wheeling—which was a growing industrial city because of the B&O, and as a major Ohio River port where the Wheeling Suspension Bridge carried the National Road across the Ohio River.

== Rowlesburg Raid ==
Brig Gen W.E. Jones

General William E. Jones, whose nickname "Grumble" reflected his irascible temper and profanity-laced tirades, commanded the 6th, 7th, 11th, and 12th Virginia Cavalry, the 1st Maryland Cavalry Battalion , the 35th Battalion of Virginia Cavalry, and McNeill's Rangers. He left Rockingham County with 3,500 men on April 21, 1863, and moved into (West) Virginia. His primary targets were two bridges in Preston County near Rowlesburg. Passing through Greenland Gap on April 25, 1863, he encountered a fortified troop detachment of the 23rd Illinois and was delayed four hours in capturing their position (Battle of Greenland Gap). Jones' Confederates continued west, riding to the summit of Backbone Mountain and on to Red House the same day (Red House is located at the intersection of US 219 and US 50). Here he encamped briefly.

The next morning, April 26, 1863, Jones sent McNeill's Rangers and the 12th Virginia Cavalry to destroy the B&O bridge at Oakland, Maryland, about 10 miles (16 km) to the north, while Jones's other forces set out to destroy the two main targets of the campaign: the wood and iron bridge crossing Cheat River and the iron bridge crossing Tray Run. Robert E. Lee would say that destroying the Cheat River Bridge would be "worth to me an army." Preserving "Lincoln's Lifeline" was of equal importance to Federal forces. The bridges crossing Cheat River and Tray Run in Rowlesburg were strategic because their destruction would halt rail traffic all the way to the Ohio River. After the initial threat posed by General Garnett's unsuccessful move toward Rowlesburg in 1861, the Rowlesburg garrison had been gradually reduced to about 250 men under the command of Major John Showalter.

Early on the morning of April 26, 1863, Jones and his cavalry rode from Red House, Maryland to the foot of Cheat Mountain on the old Northwestern Turnpike, now US 50. Upon reaching the Cheat River, Jones chose another two-prong maneuver. The east side of the covered bridge was about five miles (8 km) south of Rowlesburg, so Jones sent a small dismounted force of fewer than 100 men up and over Palmer's Knob to descend into Rowlesburg. This maneuver shortened the route to Rowlesburg by half. Jones ordered his field officer, Captain Octavius T. Weems of the 11th Virginia Cavalry, to torch the Cheat River railroad bridge "at all hazard."

Weems' Company K formed on Palmer's Knob, across the river east of town, while church services were underway. Union soldiers and townsmen grabbed their weapons and rushed to take up defensive positions. The Confederates took up attack positions about two-thirds the way down the mountain on a "bench" where they formed a line and moved forward. According to an eyewitness account, at around two-thirty, the troopers "came bounding and bellowing down the mountain, yelling like fiends just up from the pit" (Workman, 2006). Concealed behind the railroad embankment and armed with Enfield rifles (Workman, 2006). Union forces tended to use Springfield rifles and muskets, soldiers and townspeople allowed the Raiders to come within "easy rifle range," then opened with devastating fire.

According to other accounts, Weems' men also received fire from "sharpshooters" and "townsfolk," and cannons from Cannon Hill about 600 feet (180 m) above the valley, which has clear views of the battle site. The rebels replied with a volley of their own. Then, a "constant and well-directed fire was opened up on them from the town, and in half an hour not a rebel was to be seen" (Workman, 2006). The Confederate force was in full retreat. Weems' attack on the railroad bridge crossing the Cheat River had failed utterly.

Fragments of artillery shells have been found on the hillside around Palmer's Knob and below where the Confederates grouped for their charge toward the bridge. Cannonballs have been found for years on Cannon Hill and in town. Oxen had pulled the cannons to the top of the hill, presumably to defend the bridge. Howitzers mentioned in contemporary records were likely used at close range along the barricade of crossties that defenders had established. The deployment of cannons during the battle for the bridge would explain why the Confederates retreated without reaching it.

Meanwhile, with the remainder of his forces, Jones had moved two miles (3 km) west to Macomber where the River Road (now WV 72) connected Rowlesburg to the Northwestern Turnpike. He sent Col. John S. Green and his 6th Virginia Cavalry to drive in pickets and attack any perimeter defenses—creating in effect a pincer move against Rowlesburg. At two o'clock shots were heard in town from the direction of the River Road where Green's forces were driving the pickets back to the Union lines. Green advance until his troops were less than a mile from town, just beyond a point known as The Cliffs. There a log barricade thrown up by the Union forces stopped them. As the Confederate cavalry approached, Union Lt. McDonald ordered his riflemen to fire. Unable to charge past the enemy as Jones had commanded, Green ordered his men to fall back, then sent for Jones.

This decision would infuriate Gen. Jones and eventually led to Green's court-martial in September. Col. Green next ordered troops armed with carbines to dismount and move forward along the road and engage McDonald's force. They came under heavy fire from the mountaineers in the rifle-pits and fell back. Green sent another dismounted group higher up the steep mountainside to circle above McDonald's men. Strengthened by Lieutenant Hathaway's Company K, the Union line held once again. According to one source, Hathaway's force consisted mainly of "about 20 citizens" (Workman, 2006).

As the day progressed, the fighting on the river road became a desperate test of wills. According to one source, the battle raged "at intervals from 3 p.m. until dark...." (Workman, 2006). Green could do nothing to dislodge the stubborn Rowlesburg troops and townsmen from their positions. Finally, an enraged Jones personally commanded the last assault. After seeing his troops still stalemated, he ordered Green to hold his position until dusk, and then pull back to the turnpike. Jones accepted defeat and moved west to camp for the night. According to Jones, "To renew the attack without the hope of surprise was out of the question, with the difficulties of the ground against us" (Workman, 2006). The dreaded Confederate Cavalry had proven useless because of the narrow passage and steep hillside. Analogous to the Persians at Thermopylae, Jones was defeated by geography and a stubborn enemy willing to sacrifice all in his first major battle of the campaign.

Both Confederate President Jefferson Davis and Commander of the Army of Northern Virginia General Robert E. Lee considered Rowlesburg a principal target of the raid. Nonetheless, it had withstood the Confederate onslaught and was the only target of that raid to emerge unscathed. "Lincoln's Lifeline" was preserved.

The Oakland raid had succeeded in destroying bridges, but the critical Cheat River bridge remained intact. Jones blamed his subordinates for weak execution of his orders.

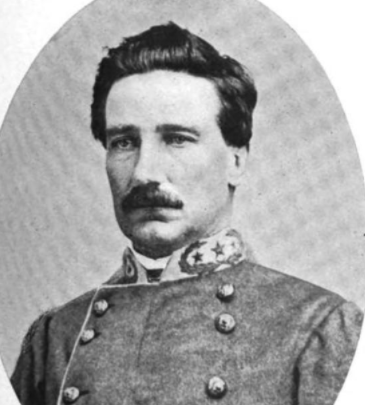
Brig Gen John D. Imboden

Gen. John Imboden commanded the 22nd, 25th, and 31st Virginia Infantry regiments, the 62nd Virginia Mounted Infantry, Dunn's Mounted Infantry, and the 18th and 19th Virginia Cavalry. His subordinate officers included Col. George S. Patton of the 22nd, and Col. William Lowther Jackson of the 19th Virginia Cavalry (later promoted to brigadier general). On April 20, 1863, Imboden moved westward from Shenandoah Mountain with 1,825 men, and reinforcements the next day increased his strength to 3,365. Imboden marched through heavy rain and then snow toward Beverly. There, he defeated Union defenders under Col. George Latham, who retreated northward, abandoning much-needed supplies.

Imboden proceeded towards Buckhannon, but reports of Union reinforcements at Philippi and no news of Jones's position caused him to return to Beverly. Union Brig. Gen. Benjamin S. Roberts, at Buckhannon, decided to withdraw his forces from there as well as from Philippi in order to reinforce Clarksburg.

That same day, April 28, Imboden learned of Roberts' retreat from Buckhannon and immediately moved his forces there. Roberts had ordered remaining supplies burned, but Imboden's men were able to salvage some, and well as collect cattle and horses.

In Washington, Gen. Henry Wager Halleck was frustrated by his subordinate officers' inability to stop the raid. He telegraphed to Gen. Robert C. Schenck: "The enemy's raid is variously estimated at from 1,500 to 4,000. You have 45,000 under your command. If you cannot concentrate enough to meet the enemy, it does not argue well for your military dispositions." To Gen. Benjamin S. Roberts in Buckhannon he wrote: "I do not understand how the roads there are impassable to you, when, by your own account, they are passable enough to the enemy."

On April 29 Imboden decided to march to Philippi. En route he met Gen. Jones and part of his command. Jones had so far burned nine railroad bridges, captured two trains, an artillery piece, 1,200 to 1,500 horses, and 1,000 head of cattle.

On May 3 they moved their forces to Weston, just 23 miles (37 km) south of Clarksburg. Two days later they led a parade through the town and some ladies presented then with a flag. Gen. Imboden took the opportunity to send his parents, who lived in Weston, to safety behind Confederate lines.

Although they had contemplated attacking Clarksburg, the two generals decided that they did not have enough men, detachments having been sent east with the cattle and sick and injured troops remained in Beverly and Buckhannon. They decided to split forces once again, Jones's troops raiding northwest and Imboden's forces moving south to Summersville with the captured supplies and the wounded.

Jones captured West Union and Cairo, burned five more bridges and disabled a railroad tunnel. In Burning Springs (aka "Oiltown"), his troops demolished the oil field and equipment, and burned 150,000 barrels (24,000 m^{3}) of oil. They then moved south to join up with Imboden.

Bad weather returned for Imboden on his march south, the last three days before reaching Summersville covering only 14 miles (23 km). At Summersville, he captured a 28-wagon supply train pulled by 170 mules and also gathered more livestock. He met again with Jones there on May 14 and once again they went their separate ways. Imboden moved south to Lewisburg. Union troops that attempted to stop his return to the Shenandoah Valley were met by another Confederate force under Col. John McCausland, who defeated them at Fayetteville, 30 miles (48 km) southwest of Summersville. Gen. Imboden reached the Shenandoah Valley in the last week of May.

Gen. Jones led his men through Greenbrier County where they rested at White Sulphur Springs on May 17 at the "Old White". They moved on to Bath County and camped near Mount Crawford in Rockingham County on May 21.

== Aftermath ==
In his final tally of the raid, Jones estimated that about 30 of the enemy were killed and 700 prisoners taken. Some 400 new recruits were added, as well as a piece of artillery, 1,000 head of cattle, and some 1,200 horses. Sixteen bridges had been destroyed, an oil field, many boats and rolling rail stock (Workman, 2006).

However, raiders also failed to destroy a suspension bridge across the Monongahela River, and important politicians of the Restored Government of Virginia who were auxiliary targets escaped. Senator Waitman Willey took a fast buggy across the Ohio River, and raiders could only burn the library of Gov. Francis Pierpont in Fairmont.

The greater part of Gen. Imboden's troops and many of Gen. Jones's troops came from western Virginia. Just a few weeks after their raid, those homes would be formally recognized by the governments in Wheeling and Washington as being located in the newest state of the Union, West Virginia, which officially achieved statehood on June 20, 1863. Although West Virginia's admission to the Union would never be formally recognized by either the Confederate government or the secessionist state government located in Richmond, the Confederacy was never again able to seriously challenge the Union for effective control of the 35th state.

== See also ==
- 1863 in West Virginia
