= Battle of New Market order of battle =

The order of battle for the Battle of New Market includes:

- Battle of New Market order of battle: Confederate
- Battle of New Market order of battle: Union
