= The Willows (Moorefield, West Virginia) =

Historic house in West Virginia, United States

- U.S. National Register of Historic Places
- Location within Eastern Panhandle of West Virginia Location within West Virginia Location within the United States
- Location: South of Moorefield, near Moorefield, West Virginia
- Coordinates: 39°2′0″N 78°57′43″W
- Area: 1 acre (0.40 ha)
- Built: 1850
- Architectural style: Greek Revival
- MPS: South Branch Valley MRA
- NRHP reference No.: 73001905
- Added to NRHP: July 2, 1973

"The Willows", also known as Randolph House, is a historic home located near Moorefield, Hardy County, West Virginia. It was built in three sections in a telescoping style. It consists of One small log house, a middle section of frame, and a brick mansion all connected end-to-end. The oldest section is the 1 1/2-story log structure built before 1773. The main section is a two-story, brick Greek Revival style mansion house. It features a square columned entrance porch. During the American Civil War, McNeill's Rangers used the farm for care of some of their horses. In the last year of the War, McNeill's Rangers commander Major Harry Gilmore used "The Willows" as his command.

It was listed on the National Register of Historic Places in 1973.
