= McNeill's Rangers =

- National flag carried by the Rangers
- Active: 1862 – May 8, 1865
- Disbanded: 1865
- Country: Confederate States of America
- Allegiance: John Hanson McNeill
- Branch: Partisan Rangers
- Type: Partisans
- Size: 210 men
- Engagements: American Civil War

Commanders
- Notable commanders: John Hanson McNeill; Jesse McNeill

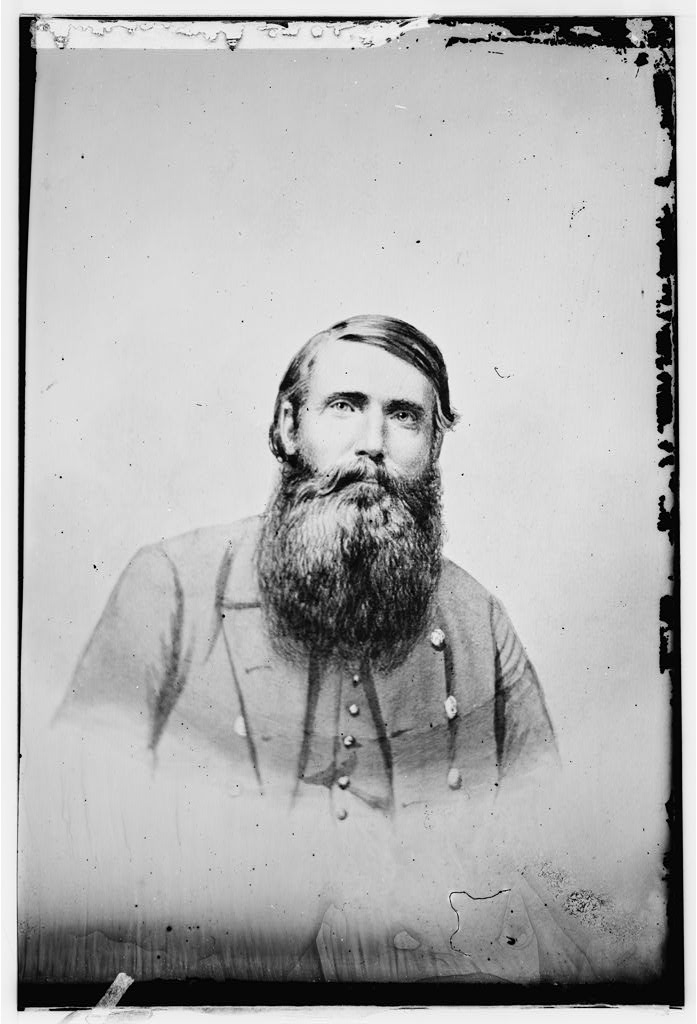
John Hanson "Hanse" McNeill in wartime

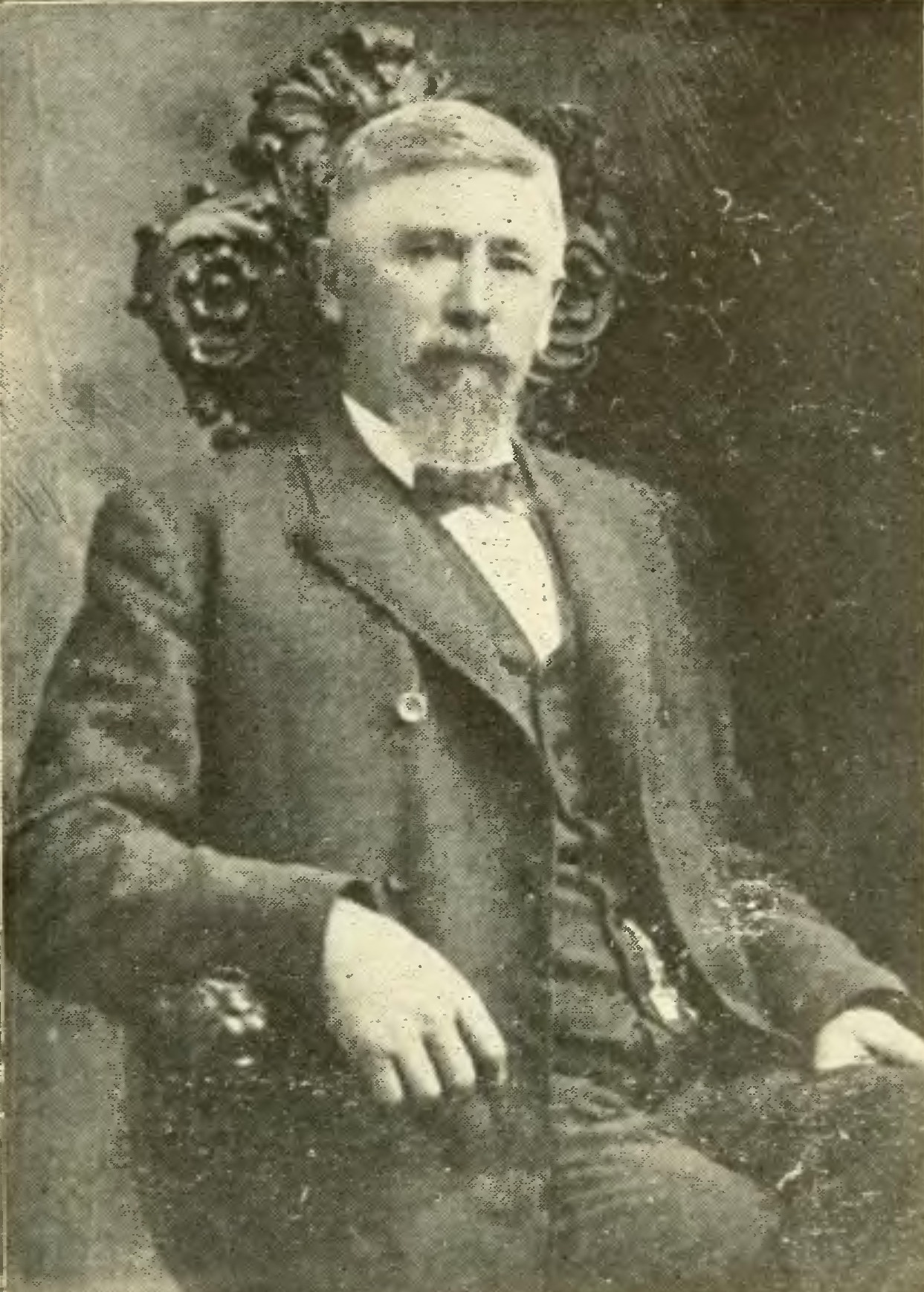
Jesse Cunningham McNeill after the War

McNeill's Rangers was an independent Confederate military force commissioned under the Partisan Ranger Act (1862) by the Confederate Congress during the American Civil War. The 210 man unit (equivalent to a small or under-strength battalion) was formed from Company E of the 18th Virginia Cavalry and the First Virginia Partisan Rangers (62nd Virginia Mounted Infantry). After the repeal of the Act on February 17, 1864, McNeill's Rangers was one of two partisan forces allowed to continue operation, the other being 43rd Battalion Virginia Cavalry (Mosby's Raiders). Both of these guerrilla forces operated in the western counties of Virginia and West Virginia. The Rangers were known to exercise military discipline when conducting raids. However, many Union generals considered Captain John Hanson McNeill (1815–1864) and his men to be "bushwhackers," not entitled to protection when captured, as was the case with other prisoners of war.

== Background ==
In 1861, John McNeill — a native of western Virginia — had formed and commanded a company in the Missouri State Guard. Although captured and imprisoned in St. Louis, he escaped the following year and made his way back to Virginia. In Richmond he obtained permission to form an independent unit in the western counties of Virginia (now West Virginia) and on September 5, 1862, McNeill became captain of Company E of the 18th Virginia Cavalry ("McNeill's Rangers"). McNeill's frequent raids on Piedmont, a town in Hampshire (now Mineral) County, West Virginia — and on Cumberland, Maryland — were aimed at disrupting the Baltimore and Ohio Railroad service. It is estimated that over 25,000 troops were diverted by Federal commanders to guard the B&O against McNeill's force. Piedmont, a small town at the foot of the Allegheny Mountains, was a frequent target due to its important machine shops and vast stores of railroad supplies. The main line of the B&O passed through a narrow valley at Piedmont. (At the time, Piedmont was also the temporary seat of Hampshire County — Romney having been given up as the county seat because of repeated Confederate raids.)

== Operations ==
=== 1862 ===
It is acknowledged that there is "no record of any important Ranger action in 1862," other than skirmishes with the Union forces of a hit-and-run variety.

=== 1863 ===
In Winter-Spring 1863, the McNeill Rangers performed scouting duties for Confederate cavalry under Brig. Gen. William E. "Grumble" Jones and John D. Imboden and provided assistance when they raided northwestern Virginia between April 24 and May 22, 1863. General Robert E. Lee wrote, "The success of Captain McNeill is very gratifying, and, I hope may be often repeated."

On February 16, the McNeill partisans captured a guarded supply train and received General's Lee praise for their actions, "This is the third feat of the same character in which Captain McNeill had displayed skill and daring."

On April 6, the Rangers clashed with the Ringgold Battalion, Pennsylvania Cavalry at Burlington, Hampshire County, taking twelve men prisoners, and capturing five wagons and twenty-five horses.

On June 7, the Rangers raided Hampshire County and seized Romney on the Northwestern Turnpike.

During the Gettysburg campaign the Rangers foraged for the Army of Northern Virginia, sending 740 heads of sheep, 160 heads of cattle, and 40 horses.

On September 11, the McNeill Rangers took part in a surprising night attack of Confederate cavalry on three Federal companies on their way from Petersburg to Moorefield; half of the Union force was taken prisoner.

=== 1864 ===
The blows of McNeill's Rangers grew heavier as the Civil War progressed. After earlier unsuccessful raids, McNeill finally succeeded in severing the B&O railroad and burning the machine shops at Piedmont, West Virginia. The President of the B&O, John W. Garrett reported on May 5, 1864, to Secretary of War Edwin M. Stanton that "the extensive machine and carpenter shops of Piedmont have been burned. The engine and cars of the east-bound main train and two-tonnage trains have also been destroyed. Five other engines damaged. ... The heat of the fire at the wreck of the trains at Bloomington had been too intense to permit much work, but during the night we expect to have the entire road again clear and train running regularly."

Captain McNeill's official report to James A. Seddon, the Confederate Secretary of War, reads:

...We burned some seven large buildings filled with the finest machinery, engines, and railroad cars; burned nine railroad engines, some seventy-five or eighty burthern cars, two trains of cars heavily laden with commissary stores, and sent six engines with full head of steam toward New Creek. Captured the mail and mail train and 104 prisoners on the train. ...

Brigadier General Benjamin F. Kelley, the Federal commander in the area, was especially irritated at the tempo of their raids and the havoc created by each one. On May 22, 1864, in a special communique to Colonel Higgins at Green Spring, Kelley ordered: "As soon as practicable send Captain Hart with 125 or 150 men on a scout up the east side of the river, to Moorefield and vicinity, after McNeill." Kelley continued: "It is not necessary for me to give Captain Hart any minute instructions. He is well acquainted in that vicinity. I will simply say I want McNeill killed, captured, or driven out of this valley." Kellys' 150 men were not enough, and McNeill escaped.

McNeill's Rangers also had pro-Union irregulars to contend with in western Virginia; northern Pendleton County, in particular, was pro-Union and organized itself into the "Pendleton Home Guards" which frequently confronted the roving confederate bands. On 19 July 1864 near Petersburg, a detachment of McNeill's Rangers attacked about 30 Home Guards under Captain John Boggs (whose company was known as the "Swamp Dragons"). The confederates were repulsed and their leader, Lieutenant Dolen, killed.

McNeill's Rangers played a role in May 1864 at the Battle of New Market. McNeill's unit of 18th Virginia Cavalry was among those who fought a delaying action at Rude's Hill, under the command of Col. John Imboden. The 18th Virginia Cavalry slowed the Union advance, enabling Gen. John Breckinridge to gather the main body of his Confederate forces at New Market, about 4 miles away. New Market was a decisive Confederate victory, forcing the Federals into a disorganized retreat.

In a predawn raid on 3 Oct. 1864, Captain McNeill led approximately 50 Confederate rangers against roughly 100 Union troopers of the 8th Ohio Cavalry Regiment guarding a bridge from Meems Bottom, a strategic crossing of the Valley Turnpike over the North Fork of the Shenandoah River to Mt. Jackson in the Shenandoah Valley. The attack lasted just fifteen minutes with most of the Union cavalry captured but McNeill, one of the best-known and feared Confederate partisan raiders, was mortally wounded. He was taken to a house on Rude's Hill, where his identity was later discovered by Union General Philip Sheridan, after McNeill reportedly gave himself up. Sheridan actually met with McNeill, who was being nursed by a Methodist minister's wife at the house. McNeill was later secreted away by a band of Confederates after the Federals had temporarily left, thinking him too incapacitated to move and thus no need to guard. McNeill was taken by the Confederates to Harrisonburg where he died on November 10. Command of the Rangers passed to his son, Jesse Cunningham McNeill, who had served as Lieutenant under his father. A detachment of the 14th Pennsylvania Cavalry assisted the 8th Ohio at Meems Bottom Bridge on the October 3, 1864 raid. Many Troopers of the 14th were captured and later Paroled.

=== 1865 ===
In January 1865, Major Harry Gilmor came to West Virginia for recruiting and staging attacks against the Baltimore and Ohio Railroad; he used The Willows near Moorefield, West Virginia, as his command post. The McNeill Rangers used nearby Mill Island and McNeill family-owned Willow Wall as hospitals. General Philip Sheridan received intelligence about Gilmor's whereabouts and a scouting party captured him in bed on February 4, 1865.

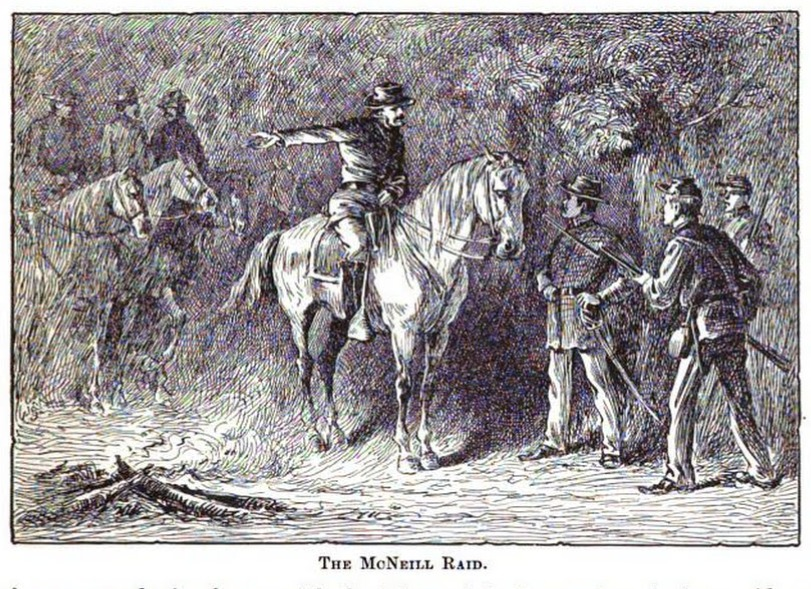
"McNeill, still personating the Ohio captain, said, "I wish that General Grant would remove granny Kelley from Cumberland, and put Crook in command," and in this wish the outpost officer concurred, when Crook laughed audibly and again punched Kelley's leg next to him; and from that time till they got to Richmond, Crook lost no opportunity to poke fun at him."

On the night of February 21, 1865, Jesse McNeill and 65 Rangers traveled 60 miles behind enemy lines to Cumberland, Maryland. Without being detected, they captured both Union Major General George Crook and Brig. Gen. Benjamin Franklin Kelley from their beds. They evaded pursuing Federal cavalry and delivered the captured generals to Lieutenant General Jubal A. Early, who forwarded the prisoners to Richmond and commissioned Jesse McNeil as Captain of the Rangers. In the words of Gen. Sheridan,

The capture of Gilmore caused the disbandment of the party he had organized at the "camp-meeting," most of the men he had recruited returning to their homes discouraged, though some few joined the bands of Woodson and young Jesse McNeil, which, led by the latter, dashed into Cumberland, Maryland, at 3 o'clock on the morning of the 21st of February and made a reprisal by carrying off General Crook and General Kelly, and doing their work so silently and quickly that they escaped without being noticed.

On May 8, 1865, the McNeill's Rangers surrendered and were paroled.

== See also ==
- List of Virginia Civil War units
- List of West Virginia Civil War Confederate units
- Charles Mynn Thruston
