= John Hanson McNeill =

Confederate Army officer (1815–1864)

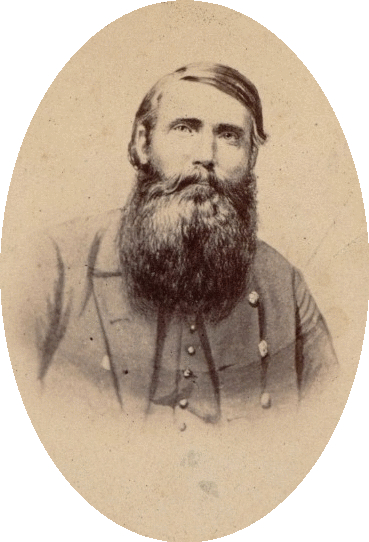
- Bust portrait of John H. McNeill in uniform
- Born: June 12, 1815; Near Moorefield, Virginia (now West Virginia)
- Died: November 10, 1864 (aged 49); Harrisonburg, Virginia
- Military career
- Allegiance: Confederate States of America
- Branch: Confederate States Army
- Service years: 1861–1864
- Rank: Captain
- Unit: Company E of the 18th Virginia cavalry
- Commands: McNeill's Rangers
- Conflicts: American Civil War

John Hanson "Hanse" McNeill (June 12, 1815 – November 10, 1864) was a Confederate soldier who served as a captain in the Confederate Army during the American Civil War. He led McNeill's Rangers, an independent irregular Confederate military company commissioned under the Partisan Ranger Act.

== Early and family life ==
McNeill was born near Moorefield, Virginia (now West Virginia). He was the son of Strother and Amy Pugh McNeill. In 1848, he moved himself, his wife, three sons and one daughter to Boone County, Missouri, where he operated a cattle business.

== Civil War ==
In 1861, he formed and was named commander of a company in the Missouri State Guard, seeing action in Boonville, Carthage, Wilson's Creek, and Lexington. Although captured and imprisoned in St. Louis, he escaped on June 15, 1862, and made his way back to Virginia.

In Richmond, he obtained permission to form an independent unit in the western counties of West Virginia and Virginia in order to disrupt Union activities in the area. This was granted, and on September 5, 1862, McNeill became captain of Company E of the 18th Virginia Cavalry, more commonly known as McNeill's Rangers. Along with raids on railroads and wagon trains, he first proposed the operation that became the Jones-Imboden Raid. Opponents called him a Bushwhacker.

== Death and legacy ==
On October 3, 1864, McNeill led his unit in a successful predawn attack on a detachment of the 8th Ohio Cavalry Regiment guarding a bridge at Meems Bottom near Mount Jackson, Virginia. Although his forces secured supplies, McNeill was severely wounded. Taken first to the Reverend Anders Rude home nearby, he died at Hill's Hotel in Harrisonburg, Virginia (where the Massanutten Regional Library now stands) on November 10, 1864.

Initially buried in Harrisonburg with full Military and Masonic honors, his Rangers returned his body to Hardy County, West Virginia, for reinterment. He is buried in Olivet Cemetery in Moorefield, West Virginia, next to the Monument to Confederate Dead, surrounded by the graves of other Confederate soldiers.

Command of the Rangers passed to his son Jesse Cunningham McNeill after his father's death.
