= Battle of New Market order of battle: Union =

The following Union Army units and commanders fought in the Battle of New Market in the American Civil War. The Confederate order of battle is shown separately. Order of battle compiled from the army organization during the battle and the reports.

== Abbreviations used ==
=== Military rank ===
- MG = Major general
- BG = Brigadier general
- Col = Colonel
- Ltc = Lieutenant colonel
- Maj = Major
- Cpt = Captain
- Lt = Lieutenant

=== Other ===
- w = wounded
- mw = mortally wounded
- k = killed
- c = captured

== Department of West Virginia ==
MG Franz Sigel

Division	Brigade	Regiments and others
First Infantry Division (4937 men); BG Jeremiah C. Sullivan	1st Brigade (2555 men) Col Augustus Moor	18th Connecticut (599 men): Maj Henry Peale; 28th Ohio (574 men): Ltc Gottfried Becker; 116th Ohio (766 men): Col James Washburn; 123rd Ohio (616 men): Maj Horace Kellogg
First Infantry Division (4937 men); BG Jeremiah C. Sullivan	2nd Brigade (2382 men) Col Joseph Thoburn	34th Massachusetts (500 men): Col George D. Wells; 54th Pennsylvania (566 men): Col Jacob M. Campbell; 1st West Virginia (387 men): Ltc Jacob Weddle; 12th West Virginia (929 men): Col William B. Curtis
First Cavalry Division; MG Julius Stahel	1st Brigade Col William B. Tibbits	1st New York (Veteran): Col Robert F. Taylor; 1st New York (Lincoln): Ltc Alonzo W. Adams; 1st Maryland, Potomac Home Brigade (detachment): Maj J. Townsend Daniel; 21st New York: Maj Charles G. Otis; 14th Pennsylvania (detachment): Cpt Ashbel F. Duncan, Ltc William Blakely
First Cavalry Division; MG Julius Stahel	2nd Brigade Col John E. Wynkoop	15th New York: Maj H. Roessler; 20th Pennsylvania: Maj Robert B. Douglas; 22nd Pennsylvania (detachment): 1st Lt Caleb McNulty
	Artillery (>565 men, 28 total guns)	1st Maryland Light, Battery B (143 men, 6 guns): Cpt Alonzo Snow; New York Light, 30th Battery (150 men, 6 guns): Cpt Albert von Kleiser; 1st West Virginia Light, Battery D (139 men, 6 guns): Cpt John Carlin; 1st West Virginia Light, Battery G (? men, 4 guns): Cpt Chatham T. Ewing; 5th United States, Battery B (133 men, 6 guns): Cpt Henry A. du Pont
