= Benjamin S. Roberts =

Union Army General (1810–1875)

Benjamin Stone Roberts
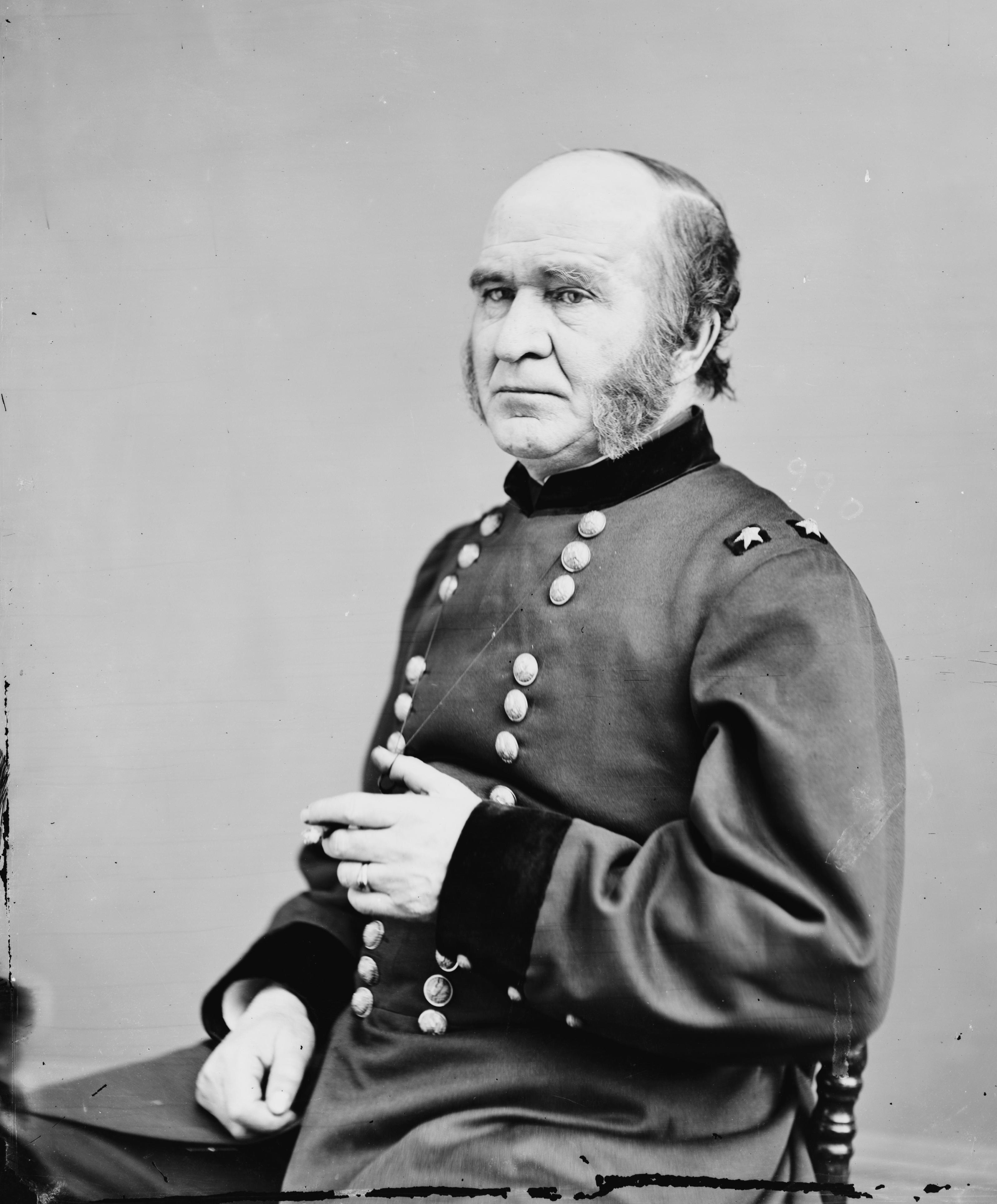
- Benjamin Stone Roberts
- Born: November 18, 1810; Manchester, Vermont
- Died: January 29, 1875 (aged 64); Washington, D.C.
- Burial place: Dellwood Cemetery, Manchester, Vermont
- Military career
- Allegiance: United States of America; Union
- Branch: United States Army; Union Army
- Service years: 1835–1839, 1846–1870
- Rank: Brigadier General; Brevet major general
- Conflicts: Mexican–American War; Siege of Veracruz; Battle of Cerro Gordo; Battle of Contreras; Battle of Churubusco; Battle of Chapultepec; American Civil War; New Mexico campaign; Battle of Valverde; Battle of Albuquerque; Battle of Peralta; Northern Virginia campaign; Battle of Cedar Mountain; First Battle of Rappahannock Station; Second Battle of Bull Run; Indian Wars

Benjamin Stone Roberts (November 18, 1810 – January 29, 1875) was an American lawyer, civil engineer, and a general in the Union Army during the American Civil War.

== Early life ==
Roberts was born in Manchester, Vermont. He graduated from the United States Military Academy in 1835, ranking near the bottom of his class (53rd out of 56). He resigned four years later to pursue a career in civil engineering on railroads in New York and overseas in Russia. After his return from Russia, he settled in Iowa, where he practiced law.

== Mexican-American War ==
In 1846, at the beginning of the Mexican–American War, Roberts was reappointed a first lieutenant, Mounted Rifles, in the Regular Army. He was promoted to captain in 1847, and saw action at Veracruz, Cerro Gordo, Contreras, Churubusco, and the capture of Mexico City, Matamoros and the Galajara pass. At Churubusco, he was brevetted major for leading an advance party of stormers. He received a further brevet, to lieutenant colonel in 1847 for gallantry during the war. After the close of hostilities, he served on the frontier and in Washington, D.C.

== Civil War ==
At the outbreak of the Civil War, Roberts was major of the 3rd U.S. Cavalry. He served in Arizona and New Mexico in 1861 and 1862. He was promoted to brigadier general of Volunteers on July 16, 1862, and assigned to General John Pope's staff as Chief of Cavalry and Inspector General for the Army of Virginia during the Northern Virginia Campaign. After Pope's defeat at the Second Battle of Bull Run, Roberts was manipulated by Secretary of War Edwin M. Stanton to prefer charges of disloyalty, disobedience and misconduct against Fitz John Porter, and testified at the subsequent court-martial, which ruined Porter's career.

After Porter's court-martial, Roberts was briefly reassigned to Acting Inspector General of Pope's Department of the Northwest before being recalled to Washington in February 1863. Robert served the spring of 1863 commanding an independent brigade in West Virginia as part of the VIII Corps and the Middle Department, before being sent back to the Department of the Northwest in May, to command the District of Iowa for the remainder of the year.

In 1864, he commanded the District of Carrollton, Louisiana, as part of the XIX Corps and ended the year as Chief of Cavalry for the Union Army's Department of the Gulf. He was subsequently sent to oversee the District of West Tennessee in 1865, where on March 13, 1865, he was brevetted major general, Volunteers, for gallant and meritorious service during the war.

== Later life ==
Roberts continued to serve in the Regular Army, as lieutenant colonel of the 3rd Cavalry, until 1868, then taught military science at Yale University until his retirement on December 15, 1870. He died in Washington, D.C., and was buried at the Oak Hill Cemetery there. He was later reinterred at Dellwood Cemetery, Manchester, Vermont.

== See also ==
- List of American Civil War generals (Union)
- Vermont in the American Civil War
