= 18th Virginia Cavalry Regiment =

- Flag of Virginia, 1861
- Active: December 1862 – April 1865
- Disbanded: April 1865
- Country: Confederacy
- Allegiance: Confederate States of America
- Branch: Confederate States Army
- Type: Cavalry
- Engagements: American Civil War: Battle of Gettysburg; Valley Campaigns of 1864

The 18th Virginia Cavalry Regiment was a cavalry regiment raised in Virginia for service in the Confederate States Army during the American Civil War. It fought with the Army of Northern Virginia, in southwest Virginia, and in the Shenandoah Valley.

18th Cavalry Regiment was organized on December 15, 1862. Most of its members had served in the 1st Regiment Virginia Partisan Rangers (subsequently the 62nd Virginia Infantry Regiment). It was primarily recruited from the counties of Randolph, Pendleton, Pocahontas, Hardy, Hampshire, Lewis, now in West Virginia, and the counties of Warren, Shenandoah, Frederick, Bath, and Highland in Virginia. Recruits also came from an additional twelve counties in Virginia and West Virginia. Approximately 1,344 men served in the regiment.

One of the famed elements of the 18th Virginia Cavalry was "McNeill's Rangers," led by Captain John Hanson McNeill. McNeill's Ranger formed Company E of the 18th Virginia Cavalry and included the First Virginia Partisan Rangers (62nd Virginia Mounted Infantry). After the repeal of the Act on February 17, 1864, McNeill's Rangers was one of two partisan forces allowed to continue operation, the other being 43rd Battalion, Virginia Cavalry (Mosby's Rangers). McNeill's Rangers operated in the western counties of Virginia and West Virginia and were among the best known and feared Confederate raiders. McNeill's frequent raids on Piedmont, a town in Hampshire (now Mineral) County, West Virginia — and on Cumberland, Maryland—were aimed at disrupting the Baltimore and Ohio Railroad (a.k.a. B&O Railroad) service. It is estimated that over 25,000 troops were diverted by Federal commanders to guard the B&O against McNeill's force. McNeill's Rangers were known to exercise military discipline when conducting raids. However, many Union generals considered them to be "bushwhackers," not entitled to protection when captured, as was the case with other prisoners of war.

The unit was assigned to John D. Imboden's and William L. Jackson's Brigade and after the participating in the Gettysburg Campaign, skirmished the Federals in western Virginia. Later it served in the Shenandoah Valley, participating in the Battle of New Market in 1864, and disbanded during April, 1865.

The field officers were Colonel George W. Imboden (brother of John D.), Lieutenant Colonel David E. Beall, and Major Alexander W. Monroe.

== See also ==
- List of Virginia Civil War units
- List of West Virginia Civil War Confederate units
