= 62nd Virginia Mounted Infantry Regiment =

- Flag of Virginia, 1861
- Active: September 1862 – April 1865
- Disbanded: April 1865
- Country: Confederate States of America
- Allegiance: Virginia
- Branch: Confederate States Army
- Type: Cavalry; Infantry
- Role: Dragoons
- Nickname(s): Imboden's Rangers
- Engagements: American Civil War: Battle of Gettysburg; Valley Campaigns of 1864

Commanders
- Notable commanders: Colonel John D. Imboden; Colonel George H. Smith

The 62nd Virginia Mounted Infantry Regiment, raised in Virginia for service in the Confederate States Army during the American Civil War, served in many capacities including the war, including as an infantry regiment, a cavalry regiment, a mounted infantry (dragoon) unit, a partisan unit of rangers, and even as a combined arms unit. It fought mostly with the Army of Northern Virginia and in western Virginia. The men were recruited primarily in the counties of Hardy, Hampshire, Barbour, Pendleton and Pocahontas in West Virginia and Augusta and Highland in Virginia .

The 62nd Regiment Mounted Infantry completed its organization in September 1862. The unit, at times known as the 1st Regiment, Virginia Partisan Rangers, was composed of infantry and cavalry until December when the cavalry companies united with other companies to form the 18th Regiment Virginia Partisan Rangers, and at times the 62nd Partisan Rangers, the 62nd Infantry, and Imboden's Partisan Rangers.

The command was mounted during the latter part of 1863 and served in Imboden's Brigade. It fought in western Virginia, was active in the Gettysburg Campaign, then participated in various conflicts in the Shenandoah Valley. The regiment took part in Early's operations and disbanded in April, 1865.

Its commanders were Colonels John D. Imboden and George H. Smith, Lieutenant Colonels Robert L. Doyle and David B. Lang, and Majors Houston Hall and George W. Imboden.

== See also ==
- List of Virginia Civil War units
- List of West Virginia Civil War Confederate units
