= Battle of Piedmont order of battle =

The order of battle for the Battle of Piedmont includes:

- Battle of Piedmont order of battle: Confederate
- Battle of Piedmont order of battle: Union
