= Battle of Piedmont order of battle: Confederate =

The following Confederate Army units and commanders fought in the Battle of Piedmont of the American Civil War. The Union order of battle is listed separately.

== Abbreviations used ==
=== Military rank ===
- MG = Major General
- BG = Brigadier General
- Col = Colonel
- Ltc = Lieutenant Colonel
- Maj = Major
- Cpt = Captain

== Confederate States Army of the Valley District ==
=== Department of Southwest Virginia and East Tennessee ===
BG William E. Jones (k)

Division	Brigade	Regiments and Others
Infantry	B. H. Jones' Brigade (1346 officers and men) Col Beuhring H. Jones (w&c)	36th Virginia: Ltc William E. Fife; 60th Virginia: Cpt James W. Johnston; 45th Virginia Battalion: Ltc Henry Beckley (w); Maj. Blake L. Woodson
Infantry	Browne's Brigade (1507or1627 officers & men) Col William H. Browne (mw)	Thomas Legion (North Carolina) (390 officers and men): Col James R. Love; 45th Virginia (617 officers and men): Ltc Alexander Davis (c); Maj Francis Miller; Virginia Cavalry (dismounted, from W.E. Jones' Brigade) (380or500 officers and men): Maj R. Henry Brewer k; Niter & Mining Battalion (Attached to Brewer's Command) (120 officers and men): Capt James F. Jones
Infantry	Vaughn's Brigade (dismounted) (1117 officers and men) BG John C. Vaughn	16th Georgia Cavalry Battalion: 1st Tennessee Cavalry: Maj John B. King (k); 12th Tennessee Cavalry Battalion: Maj George W. Day; 16th Tennessee Cavalry Battalion: 3rd Tennessee Mounted Infantry (detachment): 39th Tennessee Mounted Infantry (detachment): Maj Robert McFarland; 43rd Tennessee Mounted Infantry: Ltc David M. Key; 59th Tennessee Mounted Infantry: Col William L. Eakin; 60th, 61st & 62nd Tennessee Mounted Infantry (fragments):
Cavalry	Imboden's Brigade (1100 officers and men) BG John D. Imboden	18th Virginia Cavalry: Col George W. Imboden; 23rd Virginia Cavalry: Col Robert White; 2nd Maryland Cavalry Battalion: Cpt Harry W. Gilmor; Davis Maryland Battalion (includes two companies of Rockingham County Reserves): Cpt Thomas S. Davis; Augusta Mounted Reserves (2 companies): Captain John N. Opie
Reserves	Harper's Valley Reserves (700 officers & men) Col Kenton Harper	
Artillery		Lewisburg Battery: Cpt Thomas Bryan; Staunton Horse Artillery: Cpt John McClanahan; Augusta Reserve Battery: Cpt James C. Marquis

== See also ==
- Virginia in the American Civil War
