= Battle of Piedmont order of battle: Union =

The following Union Army units and commanders fought in the Battle of Piedmont of the American Civil War. The Confederate order of battle is listed separately.

== Abbreviations used ==
=== Military rank ===
- MG = Major General
- BG = Brigadier General
- Col = Colonel
- Ltc = Lieutenant Colonel
- Maj = Major
- Cpt = Captain
- Lt = 1st Lieutenant

== Army of the Shenandoah ==
=== Department of West Virginia ===
MG David Hunter

Division	Brigade	Regiments and Others
Infantry; BG Jeremiah C. Sullivan	1st Brigade Col Augustus Moor	18th Connecticut: Col William G. Ely; 5th New York Heavy Artillery: Ltc Edward Murray; 28th Ohio: Ltc Gottfried Becker; 116th Ohio: Col James Washburn; 123rd Ohio: Col William T. Wilson
Infantry; BG Jeremiah C. Sullivan	2nd Brigade Col Joseph Thoburn	2nd Maryland Eastern Shore: Col Robert S. Rodgers; 34th Massachusetts: Col George D. Wells; 54th Pennsylvania: Col Jacob Miller Campbell; 1st West Virginia: Ltc Jacob Weddle; 4th West Virginia (detachment): Ltc James Dayton; 12th West Virginia: Col William B. Curtis
Cavalry; MG Julius Stahel	1st Brigade Col Andrew McReynolds	1st New York (Lincoln) Cavalry: Maj Timothy Quinn; 1st New York Veteran Cavalry: Ltc John S. Platner; 21st New York Cavalry: Col William B. Tibbits; 1st Maryland Cavalry, Potomac Home Brigade: Maj Robert S. Mooney
Cavalry; MG Julius Stahel	2nd Brigade Col John Wynkoop	15th New York Cavalry: Cpt Oscar R. Colgrove; 20th Pennsylvania Cavalry: Ltc Gabriel Middleton; 22nd Pennsylvania Cavalry (Ringgold Battalion) (detachment): Maj Henry A. Meyers
Cavalry; MG Julius Stahel	Horse Artillery	Battery G, 1st West Virginia Light Artillery (1 section): Lt Samuel J. Shearer
Artillery; Cpt Henry A. du Pont		Battery B, 1st Maryland Light Artillery: Cpt Alonzo Snow; 30th New York Independent Battery: Cpt Alfred Von Kleiser; Battery D, 1st West Virginia Light Artillery: Cpt John Carlin; Battery B, 5th United States Artillery: Lt Charles Holman

== See also ==
- Virginia in the American Civil War
