= Virginia in the American Civil War =

Coordinates: 37.5°N 79°W

Virginia
- Nickname(s): "Virginny"
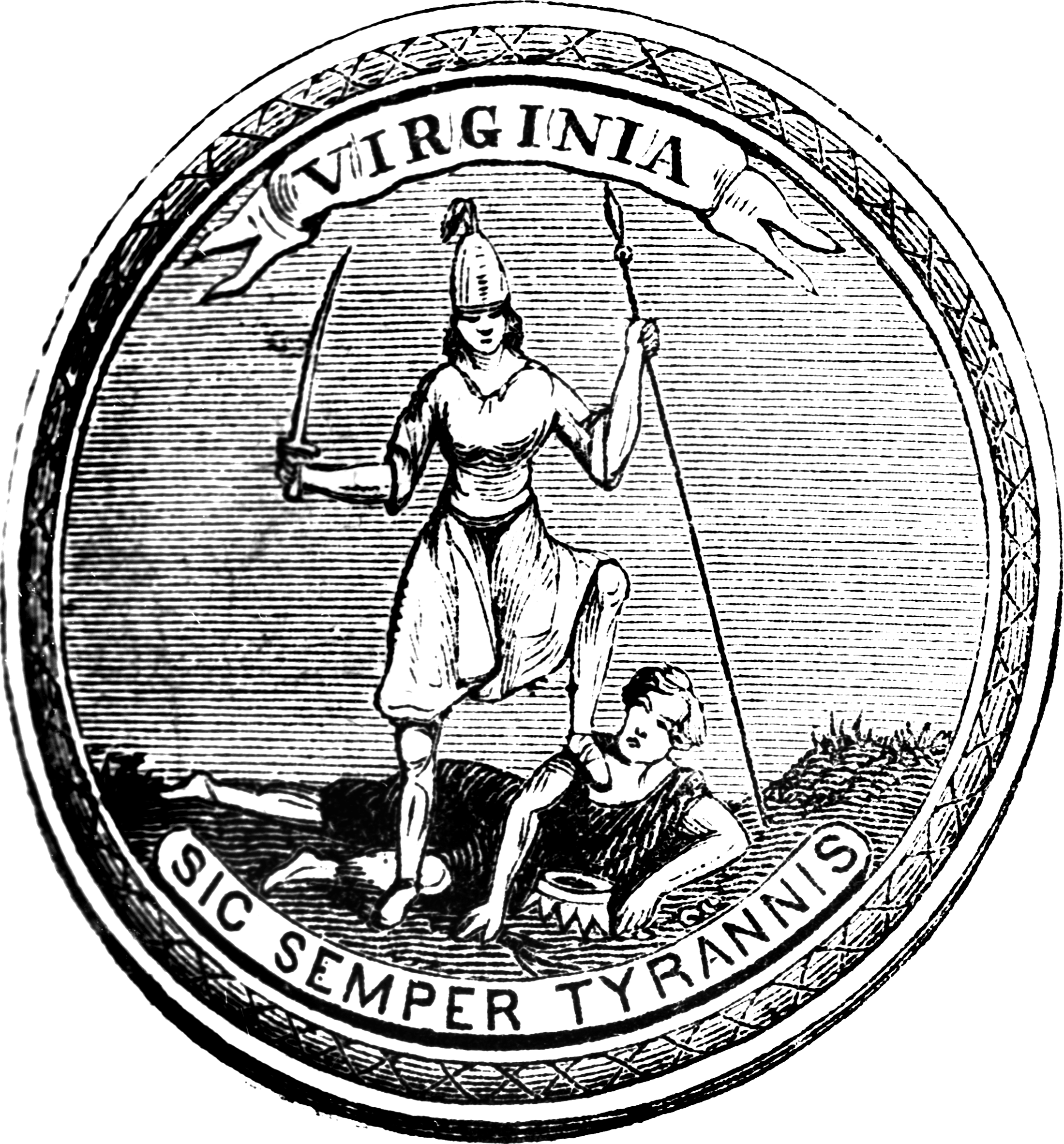
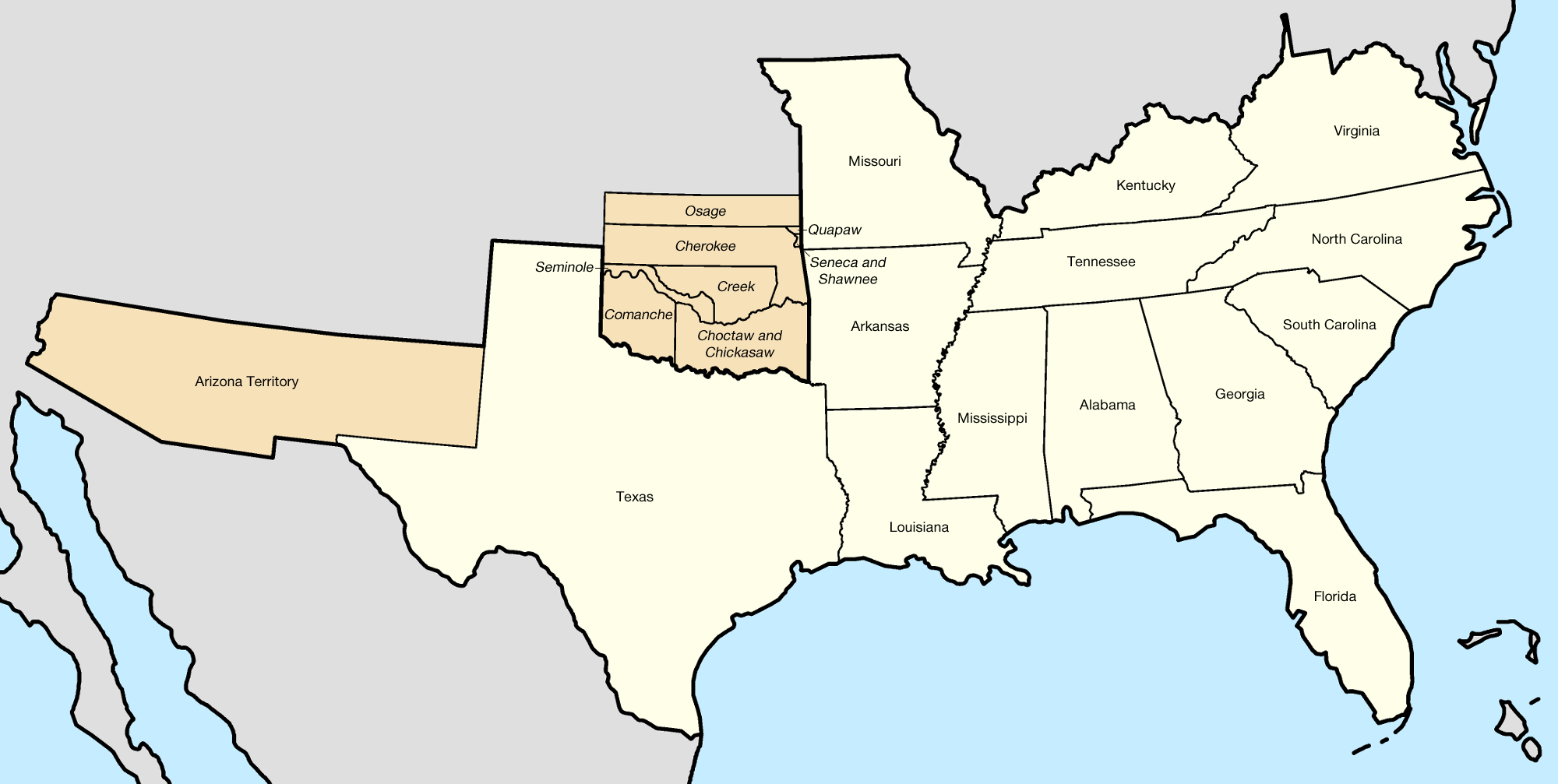
- Flag Seal Map of the Confederate States
- Capital: Richmond
- Largest city: Richmond
- Admitted to the Confederacy: May 7, 1861 (8th)
- Population: 1,596,318 total; • 1,105,453 (69.25%) free; • 490,865 (30.75%) slave
- Forces supplied: - Confederate troops: 155,000; Union troops: 38,000 (32,000 white; 6,000 black) total
- Governor: John Letcher; William Smith; Francis Pierpont
- Senators: William Ballard Preston; Allen T. Caperton; Robert M. T. Hunter; Waitman Willey; John Carlile; Lemuel Bowden
- Representatives: List
- Restored to the Union: January 26, 1870

Map of "The Seat of War" in Virginia, published by Hart & Mapother in Louisville, Kentucky

The American state of Virginia became a prominent part of the Confederacy when it joined during the American Civil War. As a Southern slave-holding state, Virginia held the state convention to deal with the secession crisis and voted against secession on April 4, 1861. Opinion shifted after the Battle of Fort Sumter on April 12, and April 15, when U.S. President Abraham Lincoln called for troops from all states still in the Union to put down the rebellion. For all practical purposes, Virginia joined the Confederacy on April 17, though secession was not officially ratified until May 23. A Unionist government was established in Wheeling and the new state of West Virginia was created by an act of Congress from 50 counties of western Virginia, making it the only state to lose territory as a consequence of the war. Unionism was indeed strong also in other parts of the State, and during the war the Restored Government of Virginia was created as rival to the Confederate Government of Virginia, making it one of the states to have 2 governments during the Civil War.

In May, it was decided to move the Confederate capital from Montgomery, Alabama, to Richmond, Virginia, in large part because, regardless of the Virginian capital's political status, its defense was deemed vital to the Confederacy's survival. On May 24, 1861, the U.S. Army moved into northern Virginia and captured Alexandria without a fight. Most of the battles in the Eastern Theater of the American Civil War took place in Virginia because the Confederacy had to defend its national capital at Richmond, and public opinion in the North demanded that the Union move "On to Richmond!" The successes of Robert E. Lee in defending Richmond are a central theme of the military history of the war. The White House of the Confederacy, located a few blocks north of the State Capitol, became home to the family of Confederate leader, former Mississippi Senator Jefferson Davis.

== Origins ==
On October 16, 1859, the radical abolitionist John Brown led a group of 22 men in a raid on the Federal Arsenal in Harpers Ferry, Virginia. U.S. troops, led by Robert E. Lee, responded and quelled the raid. Subsequently, Brown was tried and executed by hanging in Charles Town on December 2, 1859.

In 1860, the Democratic Party split into northern and southern factions over the issue of slavery in the territories and Stephen Douglas' support for popular sovereignty: after failing in both Charleston and Baltimore to nominate a single candidate acceptable to the South, Southern Democrats held their convention in Richmond, Virginia, on June 26, 1860, and nominated John C. Breckinridge as their party candidate for U.S. president.

When Republican Abraham Lincoln was elected as president, Virginians were concerned about the implications for their state. While a majority of the state would look for compromises to the sectional differences, most people also opposed any restrictions on slaveholders' rights. As the state watched to see what South Carolina would do, many Unionists felt that the greatest danger to the state came not from the North but from "rash secession" by the lower South.

== Secession ==
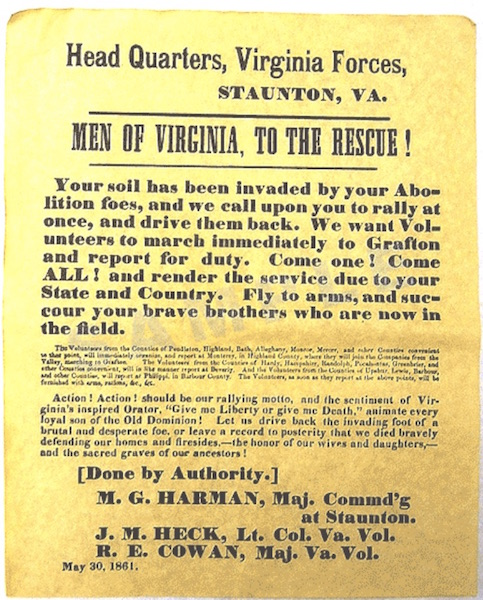
An 1861 Confederate recruiting poster from Virginia, urging men to join the Confederate cause and fight off the Union Army, which it referred to as "abolition foes"

=== Call for secession convention ===
On November 15, 1860, Virginia Governor John Letcher called for a special session of the General Assembly to consider, among other issues, the creation of a secession convention. The legislature convened on January 7 and approved the convention on January 14. On January 19 the General Assembly called for a national Peace Conference, led by Virginia native and former U.S. President John Tyler, to be held in Washington, D.C., on February 4, the same date that elections were scheduled for delegates to the secession convention.

The election of convention delegates drew 145,700 voters who elected, by county, 152 representatives. Thirty of these delegates were secessionists, thirty were unionists, and ninety-two were moderates who were not clearly identified with either of the first two groups. Nevertheless, advocates of immediate secession were clearly outnumbered. Simultaneous to the February 4 election delegates from the first six states to secede (South Carolina, Mississippi, Florida, Alabama, Georgia, and Louisiana) met in Montgomery and four days later founded the Confederate States of America.

=== Secession convention ===
The Virginia Secession Convention of 1861 met on February 13 at the Richmond Mechanics Institute, located at Ninth and Main Street in Richmond. One of the convention's first actions was to create a 21-member Federal Relations Committee, charged with reaching a compromise to the sectional differences as they affected Virginia. The committee was made up of 4 secessionists, 10 moderates, and 7 unionists. At first there was no urgency to the convention's deliberations, as all sides felt that time only aided their cause. In addition, there were hopes that the Peace Conference on January 19, led by former President John Tyler, might resolve the crisis by guaranteeing the permanence of slavery and the right to expand it into the new southwest territories. With the failure of the Peace Conference at the end of February, moderates in the convention began to waver in their support for unionism.

At the Richmond Convention in February 1861, Georgian Henry Lewis Benning, who would later be a Confederate army officer, delivered a speech in which he gave his reasoning for the urging of secession from the Union, appealing to ethnic prejudices and pro-slavery sentiments to present his case, saying that were the slave states to remain in the Union, their slaves would ultimately end up being freed by the anti-slavery Republican Party. He stated that he would rather be stricken with illness and starvation than to see black slaves liberated and given equality as citizens:

What was the reason that induced Georgia to take the step of secession? This reason may be summed up in one single proposition. It was a conviction, a deep conviction on the part of Georgia, that a separation from the North-was the only thing that could prevent the abolition of her slavery. ... If things are allowed to go on as they are, it is certain that slavery is to be abolished. By the time the north shall have attained the power, the black race will be in a large majority, and then we will have black governors, black legislatures, black juries, black everything. Is it to be supposed that the white race will stand for that? It is not a supposable case [...] war will break out everywhere like hidden fire from the earth, and it is probable that the white race, being superior in every respect, may push the other back. [...] we will be overpowered and our men will be compelled to wander like vagabonds all over the earth; and as for our women, the horrors of their state we cannot contemplate in imagination. That is the fate which abolition will bring upon the white race. [...] We will be completely exterminated, and the land will be left in the possession of the blacks, and then it will go back to a wilderness and become another Africa [...] Suppose they elevated Charles Sumner to the presidency? Suppose they elevated Fred Douglass, your escaped slave, to the presidency? What would be your position in such an event? I say give me pestilence and famine sooner than that.

— Henry Lewis Benning, speech to the Virginia Convention, February 18, 1861.

Unionist support was further eroded for many Virginians by Lincoln's first inaugural address, which they felt was "argumentative, if not defiant." Throughout the state there was evidence that support for secession was growing. The Federal Relations Committee made its report to the convention on March 9. The fourteen proposals defended both slavery and states' rights while calling for a meeting of the eight slave states still in the Union to present a united front for compromise. From March 15 through April 14 the convention debated these proposals one by one. During the debates, the sixth resolution calling for a peaceful solution and maintenance of the Union came up for discussion on April 4. Lewis Edwin Harvie of Amelia County offered a substitute resolution calling for immediate secession. This was voted down by 88 to 45 and the next day the convention continued its debate. Approval of the last proposal came on April 12. The goal of the unionist faction after this approval was to adjourn the convention until October, allowing time for both the convention of the slave states and Virginia's congressional elections in May which, they hoped, would produce a stronger mandate for compromise.

One delegate reiterated the state's cause of secession and the purpose of the convention:

Sir, the great question which is now uprooting this Government to its foundation – the great question which underlies all our deliberations here, is the question of African slavery.

— Thomas F. Goode, speech to the Virginia Secession Convention, March 28, 1861.

Mississippian Fulton Anderson told the convention that the Republicans were hostile to the slave states, accusing the Republican Party of having an "unrelenting and eternal hostility to the institution of slavery." Ultimately, the convention declared that slavery should continue, and that it should be extended into U.S. territories:

Proposals Adopted by the Virginia Convention of 1861 The first resolution asserted states' rights per se; the second was for retention of slavery; the third opposed sectional parties; the fourth called for equal recognition of slavery in both territories and non-slave states; the fifth demanded the removal of federal forts and troops from seceded states; the sixth hoped for a peaceable adjustment of grievances and maintaining the Union; the seventh called for Constitutional amendments to remedy federal and state disputes; the eighth recognized the right of secession; the ninth said the federal government had no authority over seceded states since it refused to recognize their withdrawal; the tenth said the federal government was empowered to recognize the Confederate States; the eleventh was an appeal to Virginia's sister states; the twelfth asserted Virginia's willingness to wait a reasonable period of time for an answer to its propositions, providing no one resorted to force against the seceded states; the thirteenth asked United States and Confederate States governments to remain peaceful; and the fourteenth asked the border slave states to meet in conference to consider Virginia's resolutions and to join in Virginia's appeal to the North.

=== Battle of Fort Sumter ===
The Battle of Fort Sumter was the turning point of secessionist sentiment in Virginia. Unionists were concerned about the continued presence of Confederate forces at Fort Sumter, despite assurances communicated informally to them by U.S. Secretary of State William Seward that it would be abandoned. Seward however was acting without Lincoln's approval, and Lincoln had no such intention to abandon the Fort. Lincoln and Seward were also concerned that the Virginia convention was still in session as of the first of April while secession sentiment was growing. At Lincoln's invitation, unionist John B. Baldwin of Augusta County met with the president on April 4. Baldwin explained that the unionists needed the evacuation of Fort Sumter, a national convention to debate the sectional differences, and a commitment by Lincoln to support constitutional protections for southern rights (i.e. the continuation of slavery). Over Lincoln's skepticism, Baldwin argued that Virginia would be out of the Union within forty-eight hours if either side fired a shot in the vicinity of the fort. By some accounts, Lincoln offered to evacuate Fort Sumter if the Virginia convention would adjourn.

Events then outpaced the convention. On April 6, amid rumors that the North was preparing for war, the convention voted by a narrow 63–57 to send a three-man delegation to Washington to determine from Lincoln what his intentions were. On that same day, Lincoln informed the Governor of South Carolina that a ship with food but no ammunition would attempt to reinforce Fort Sumter. An April 9 Confederate cabinet meeting resulted in President Davis ordering General P. G. T. Beauregard to take the Fort before supplies could reach it. The delegation reached Washington on April 12, having been delayed by bad weather. But that morning, Confederate forces had already opened fire on Fort Sumter, beginning the Civil War. The delegates learned of the attack on Fort Sumter from Lincoln, and the president informed them of his intent to hold the fort and respond to force with force. Reading from a prepared text to prevent any misinterpretations of his intent, Lincoln told them that he had made it clear in his inaugural address that the forts and arsenals in the South were government property and "if ... an unprovoked assault has been made upon Fort Sumter, I shall hold myself at liberty to re-possess, if I can, like places which have been seized before the Government was devolved upon me."

News of the Fort's fall reached Richmond on the evening of April 13. Jubilant crowds poured into the streets and expressed fervent secessionist desire. Richmond reacted with large public demonstrations in support of the Confederacy on April 13 when it first received the news of the attack. A 100-gun salute was fired at the state capitol in honor of the victory. The American flag was lowered from over the capitol building, replaced with the Confederate flag. Crowds shouted for "Jeff Davis," "the Southern Confederacy," and "Dixie's Land."

The convention reconvened on April 13 to reconsider Virginia's position, given the outbreak of hostilities. With Virginia still in a delicate balance, with no firm determination yet to secede, sentiment turned more strongly toward secession on April 15, following President Lincoln's call to all states that had not declared a secession, including Virginia, for sending troops to assist in halting the insurrection and recovering the captured forts:

War Department, Washington, April 15, 1861. To His Excellency the Governor of Virginia: Sir: Under the act of Congress for calling forth "militia to execute the laws of the Union, suppress insurrections, repel invasions, etc.," approved February 28, 1795, I have the honor to request your Excellency to cause to be immediately detached from the militia of your State the quota designated in the table below, to serve as infantry or rifleman for the period of three months, unless sooner discharged. Your Excellency will please communicate to me the time, at or about, which your quota will be expected at its rendezvous, as it will be met as soon as practicable by an officer to muster it into the service and pay of the United States.

— Simon Cameron, Secretary of War.

The quota of Virginia's state militia called for, in the table attached to this letter, was three regiments which would have a total of 2,340 men to rendezvous at Staunton, Wheeling and Gordonsville. Governor Letcher and the recently reconvened Virginia Secession Convention considered this request from Lincoln "for troops to invade and coerce" lacking in constitutional authority, and out of scope of the Act of 1795. Governor Letcher's "reply to that call wrought an immediate change in the current of public opinion in Virginia", whereupon he issued the following reply:

Executive Department, Richmond, Va., April 15, 1861. Hon. Simon Cameron, Secretary of War: Sir: I have received your telegram of the 15th, the genuineness of which I doubted. Since that time I have received your communications mailed the same day, in which I am requested to detach from the militia of the State of Virginia "the quota assigned in a table," which you append, "to serve as infantry or rifleman for the period of three months, unless sooner discharged." In reply to this communication, I have only to say that the militia of Virginia will not be furnished to the powers at Washington for any such use or purpose as they have in view. Your object is to subjugate the Southern States, and a requisition made upon me for such an object – an object, in my judgment, not within the purview of the Constitution or the act of 1795 – will not be complied with. You have chosen to inaugurate civil war, and, having done so, we will meet it in a spirit as determined as the administration has exhibited toward the South.

— Respectfully, John Letcher

April 17 marked the effective secession of Virginia. Ex-Governor Henry A. Wise gave a fiery speech in which he announced that as he spoke the Virginia militia was seizing the Federal armory at Harper's Ferry, which had only a few years prior been the subject of John Brown's raid. So too was the Gosport Navy Yard about to be seized. At Gosport, the Union Navy, believing that several thousand militia were headed their way, evacuated and abandoned Norfolk, Virginia, and the navy yard, burning and torching as many of the ships and facilities as possible. Thereafter, the secession convention voted, provisionally, to secede, on the condition of ratification by a statewide referendum. That same day, the convention adopted an ordinance of secession, in which it stated the immediate cause of Virginia's declaring of secession, "injury of the people of Virginia'' and ''the oppression of the Southern slave-holding States".

Historian Ed Ayers, who felt that "even Fort Sumter might have passed, however, had Lincoln not called for the arming of volunteers", wrote of the convention's final decision:

The decision came from what seemed to many white Virginians the unavoidable logic of the situation: Virginia was a slave state; the Republicans had announced their intention of limiting slavery; slavery was protected by the sovereignty of the state; an attack on that sovereignty by military force was an assault on the freedom of property and political representation that sovereignty embodied. When the federal government protected the freedom and future of slavery by recognizing the sovereignty of the states, Virginia's Unionists could tolerate the insult the Republicans represented; when the federal government rejected that sovereignty, the threat could no longer be denied even by those who loved the Union.

=== Secession ===
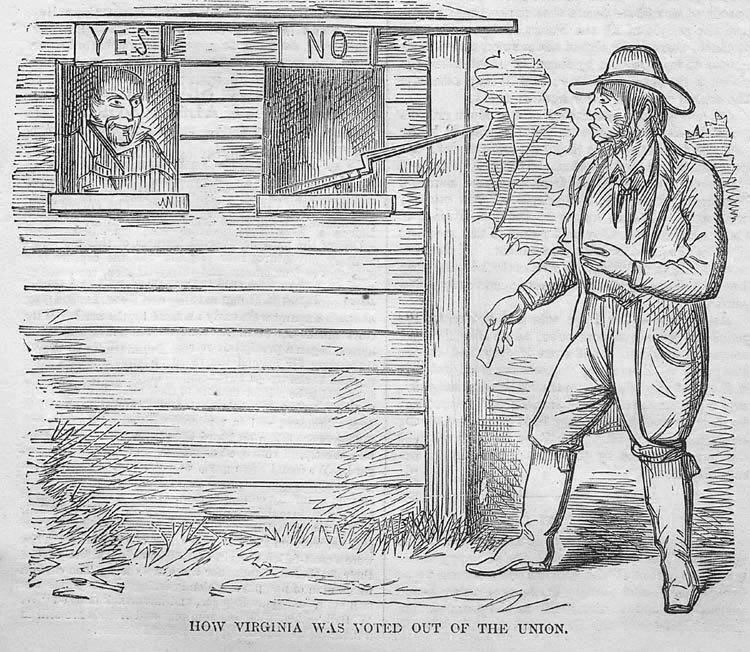
"How Virginia Was Voted Out Of The Union", a Harpers Weekly on June 15, 1861

Virginia's ordinance of secession was ratified in a referendum held on May 23, 1861, by a vote of 132,201 to 37,451.

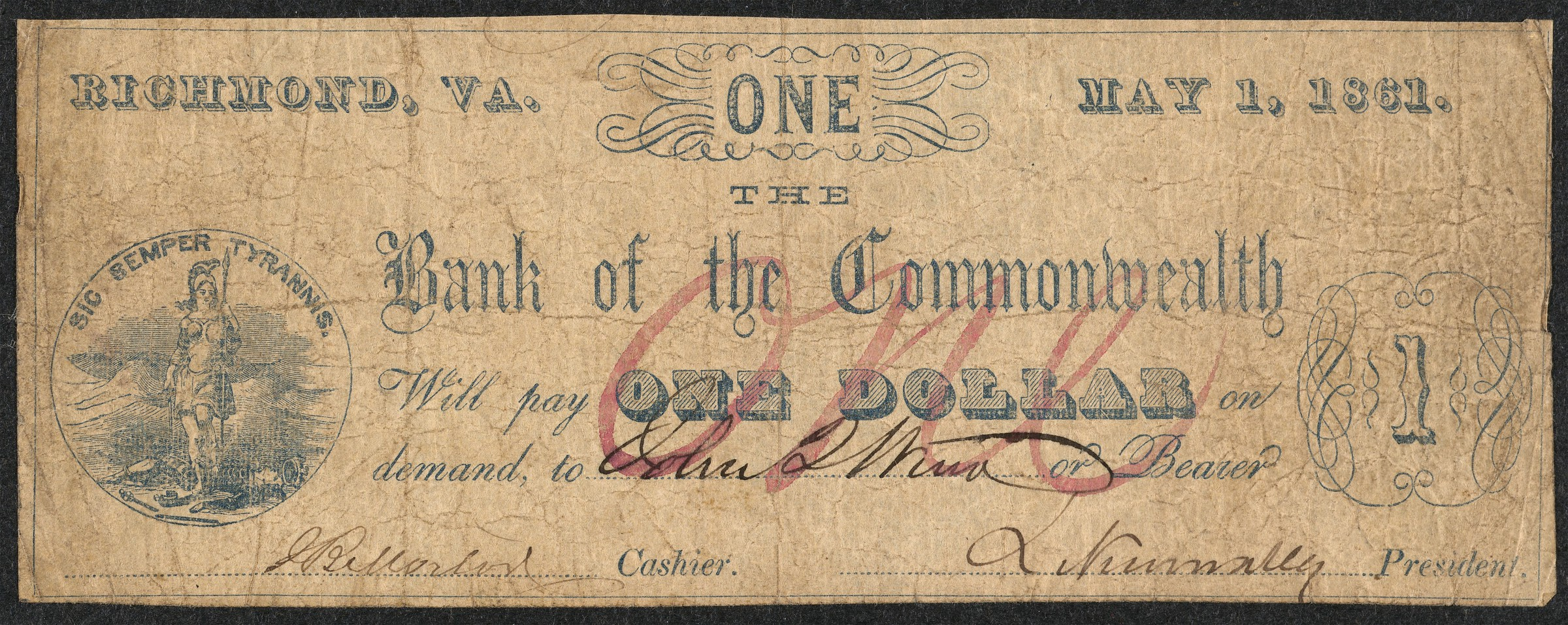
An 1861 Bank of the Commonwealth 1 dollar banknote

The Confederate Congress proclaimed Richmond to be new capital of the Confederacy and Confederate troops moved into northern Virginia before the referendum was held. The actual number of votes for or against secession are unknown since votes in many counties in northwestern and eastern Virginia (where most of Virginia's unionists lived) were "discarded or lost." Governor Letcher "estimated" the vote for these areas.

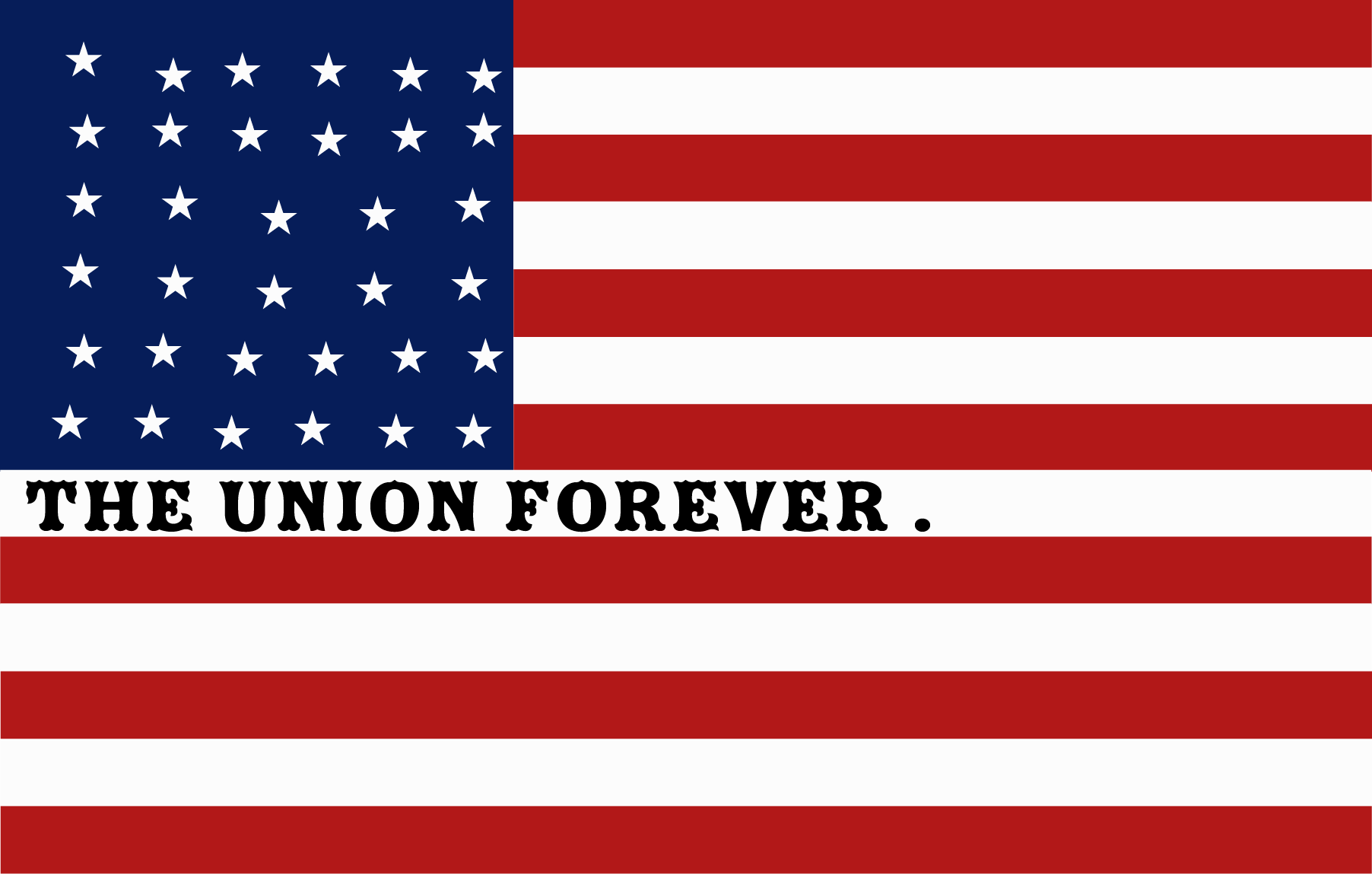
Digital remake of the flag raised by a pro-union farmer in Accomack County, when told to take it down by locals he instead fled up north

The reaction to the referendum was swift on both sides. Confederate troops shut down the Baltimore and Ohio Railroad, one of Washington City's two rail links to Ohio and points west. The next day, the U.S. Army moved into northern Virginia. With both armies now in northern Virginia, the stage was set for war. In June, Virginian unionists met at the Wheeling Convention to set up the Restored Government of Virginia. Francis Pierpont was elected governor. The restored government raised troops to defend the Union and appointed two senators to the United States Senate. It resided in Wheeling until August 1863 when it moved to Alexandria with West Virginia's admittance to the Union. During the summer of 1861, parts of the northern, western and eastern Virginia, including the Baltimore and Ohio railroad, were returned to Union control. Norfolk returned to union control in May 1862. These areas would be administered by the Restored Government of Virginia, with the northwestern counties later becoming the new state of West Virginia. In April 1865, Francis Pierpont and the Restored Government of Virginia moved to Richmond.

== Strategic significance ==
Virginia's strategic resources played a key role in dictating the objectives of the war there. Its agricultural and industrial capacity, and the means of transporting this production, were major strategic targets for attack by Union forces and defense by Confederate forces throughout the war.

Most importantly, Virginia brought with it a 54 year old U.S. Army Colonel: Robert E. Lee. Lee was offered a Union command on April 18, one day after Virginia's effective secession, but he turned it down. Lee took up a Confederate army commission five days later, becoming a brigadier general. Lee would prove to be one of the Confederates' most valuable assets.

=== Richmond ===
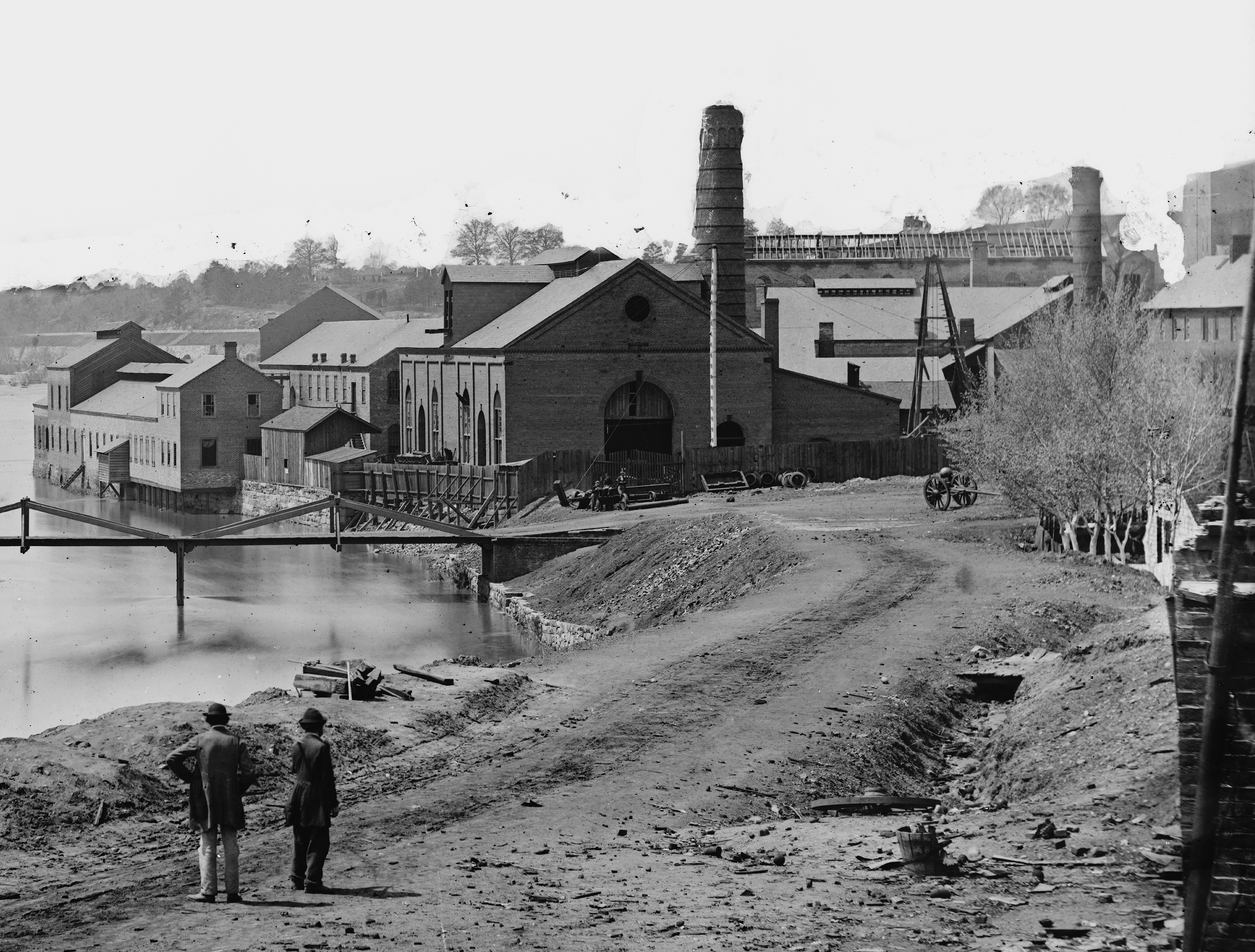
Tredegar Iron Works in Richmond, Virginia in April 1865

The Confederacy's need for war materiel played a very significant role in its decision to move its capital from Montgomery, Alabama, to Richmond, in May 1861, despite its dangerous northern location 100 miles south of the United States capital in Washington, D.C. It was mainly for this industrial reason that the Confederates fought so hard to defend the city. The capital of the Confederacy could easily be moved again if necessary, but Richmond's industry and factories could not be moved.

Richmond was the only large-scale industrial city controlled by the Confederacy during most of the Civil War. The city's warehouses were the supply and logistical center for Confederate forces. The city's Tredegar Iron Works, the 3rd largest foundry in the United States at the start of the war, produced most of the Confederate artillery, including a number of giant rail-mounted siege cannons. The company also manufactured railroad locomotives, boxcars and rails, as well as steam propulsion plants and iron plating for warships. Richmond's factories also produced guns, bullets, tents, uniforms, harnesses, leather goods, swords, bayonets, and other war materiel. A number of textile plants, flour mills, brick factories, newspapers and book publishers were located in Richmond. Richmond had shipyards too, although they were smaller than the shipyards controlled by the Union in Norfolk, Virginia.

The city's loss to the Union army in April 1865 made a Union victory in the Civil War inevitable. With Virginia firmly under Union control, including the industrial centers of Richmond, Petersburg and Norfolk, the mostly rural and agricultural deep south lacked the industry needed to supply the Confederate war effort.

=== Other locations ===
At the outbreak of the war Petersburg, Virginia, was second only to Richmond among Virginia cities in terms of population and industrialization. The juncture of five railroads, it provided the only continuous rail link to the Deep South. Located 20 miles (32 km) south of Richmond, its defense was a top priority; the day that Petersburg fell, Richmond fell with it.

In the western portion of the state (as defined today), the Shenandoah Valley was considered the "Breadbasket of the Confederacy". The valley was connected to Richmond via the Virginia Central Railroad and the James River and Kanawha Canal.

The Blue Ridge mountains and similar sites had long been mined for iron (though as the war progressed, shortages in manpower limited their production). In southwest Virginia, the large salt works at Saltville provided a key source of salt to the Confederacy, essential in preserving food for use by the army. It was the target of two battles.

== Major campaigns ==
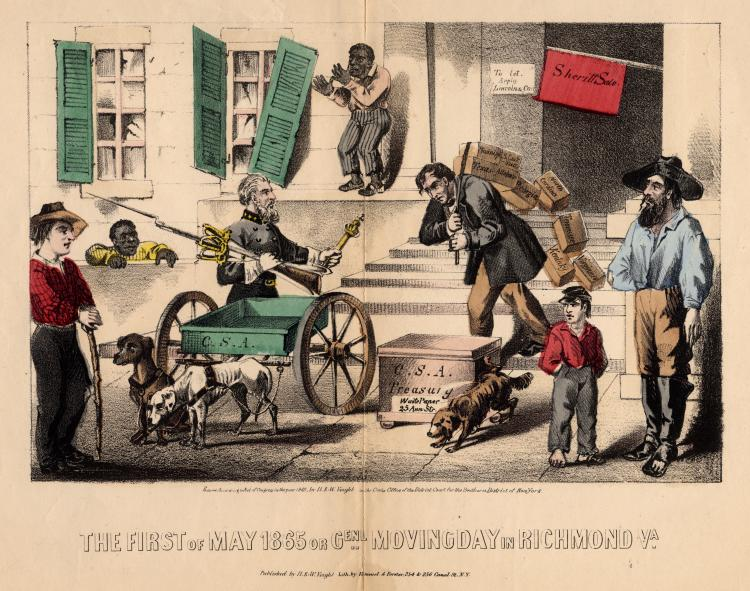
The First of May 1865 or Genl. Moving Day in Richmond Va, an 1865 political cartoon depicting Confederate leaders packing up their belongings as they prepare to flee Richmond to avoid the Union Army with a slave looking on contemptuously

The first and last significant battles of the war were held in Virginia, the first being the First Battle of Bull Run and the last being the Battle of Appomattox Courthouse. From May 1861 to April 1865, Richmond was the capital of the Confederacy. The White House of the Confederacy, located a few blocks north of the State Capital, was home to the family of Confederate President Jefferson Davis.

=== 1861 ===
The first major battle of the Civil War occurred on July 21, 1861. Union forces attempted to take control of the railroad junction at Manassas for use as a supply line, but the Confederate Army had moved its forces by train to meet the Union. The Confederates won the First Battle of Bull Run (known as "First Battle of Manassas" in northern naming convention) and the year went on without a major fight.

=== 1862 ===
Union general George B. McClellan was forced to retreat from Richmond by Robert E. Lee's army. Union general Pope was defeated at the Second Battle of Manassas. Following the one-sided Confederate victory Battle of Fredericksburg.

=== 1863 ===
When fighting resumed in the spring of 1863, Union general Hooker was defeated at Chancellorsville by Lee's army.

=== 1864 ===
Ulysses Grant's Overland Campaign was fought in Virginia. The campaign included battles of attrition at the Wilderness, Spotsylvania and Cold Harbor and ended with the Siege of Petersburg and Confederate defeat.

In September 1864, the Southern Punch, a newspaper based in Richmond, reiterated the Confederacy's cause:

[...] WE ARE FIGHTING FOR INDEPENDENCE THAT OUR GREAT AND NECESSARY DOMESTIC INSTITUTION OF SLAVERY SHALL BE PRESERVED, and for the preservation of other institutions of which slavery is the ground work ...

— Southern Punch, (September 19, 1864), emphasis added.

=== 1865 ===
In April 1865, the Confederate government fled Richmond as U.S. forces approached the city. As the Confederates fled, they set fire to Richmond's public works to prevent them from being used by U.S. forces. A fire set in Richmond by the retreating Confederate army burned 25 percent of the city before being put out by the Union Army. It was the Union Army that saved the city from widespread conflagration and ruin. As a result, Richmond emerged from the Civil War as an economic powerhouse, with most of its buildings and factories undamaged.

== Battles in Virginia ==
- Battle of First Bull Run (First Manassas) (July 21, 1861)
- Battle of Hampton Roads (USS Monitor and CSS Virginia)
- Peninsula Campaign
- Seven Days Battles
- Battle of Malvern Hill
- Northern Virginia Campaign
- Battle of Second Bull Run (Second Manassas)
- Battle of Fredericksburg
- Battle of Chancellorsville
- Bristoe Campaign
- Mine Run Campaign
- Overland Campaign
- Bermuda Hundred Campaign
- Battle of Cold Harbor
- Richmond-Petersburg Campaign
- Battle of the Crater (July 30, 1864)
- Valley Campaigns of 1864
- Appomattox Campaign
- Battle of Brandy Station
- Battle of Ball's Bluff

== Involvement (by location) ==
- Alexandria in the Civil War
- Fort Monroe in the Civil War
- Fredericksburg in the Civil War
- Norfolk Naval Shipyard in the Civil War
- Northern Virginia in the Civil War
- Petersburg in the Civil War
- Richmond in the Civil War
- Williamsburg in the Civil War
- Winchester in the Civil War

=== Notable pro-Confederate people from Virginia ===
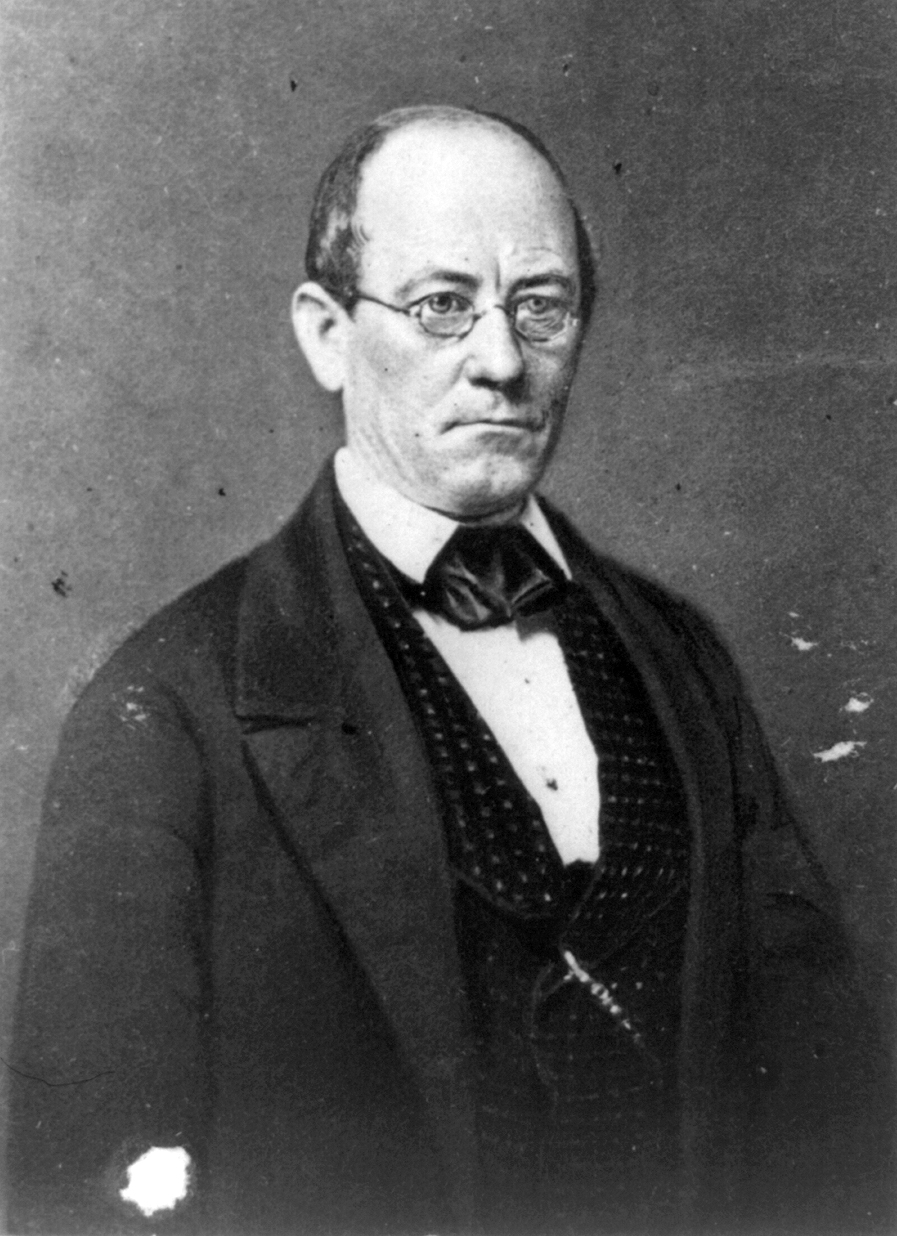
Gov.
John Letcher

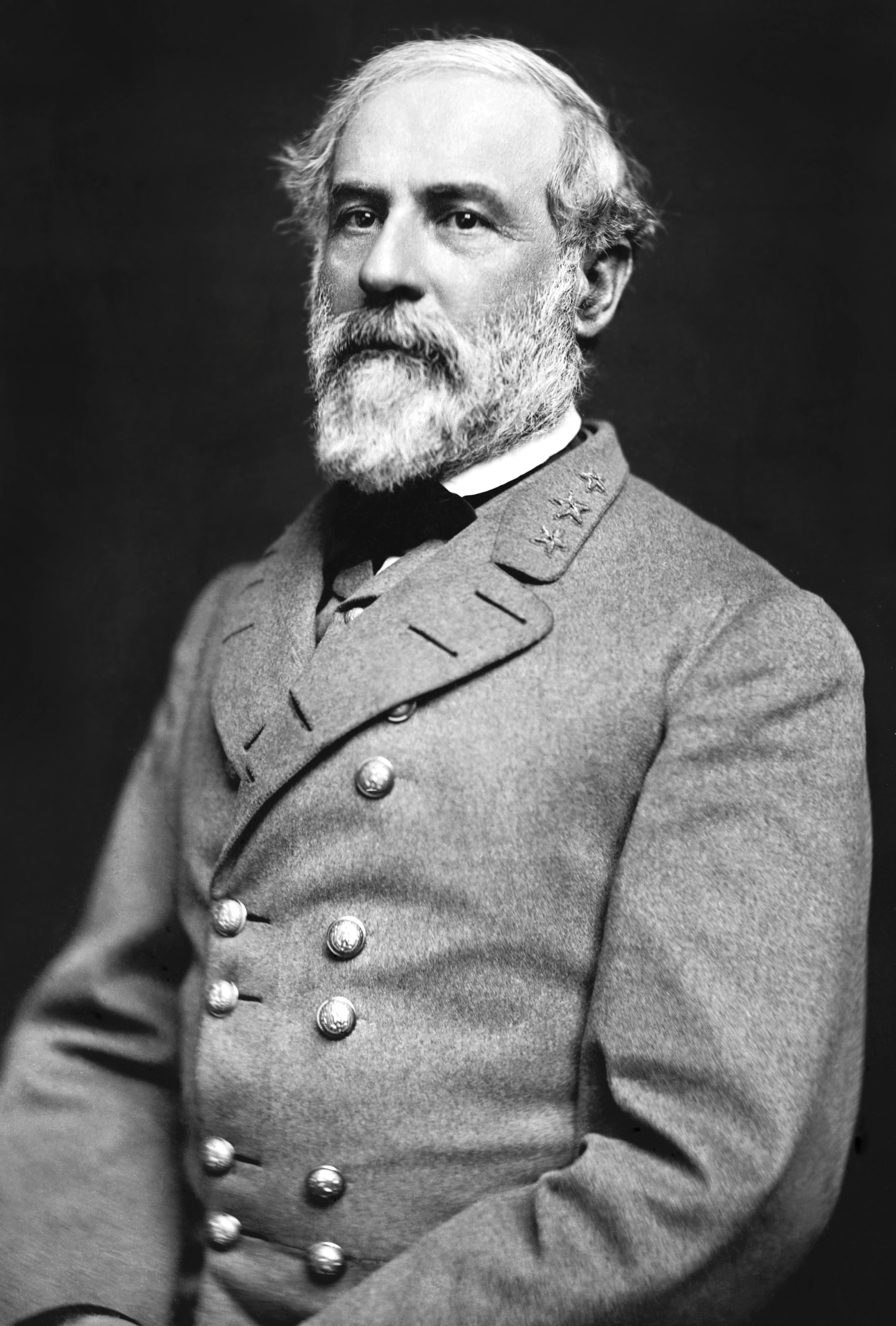
Gen.
Robert E. Lee

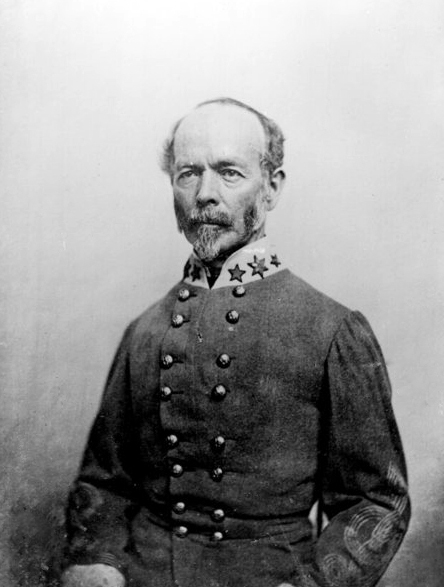
Gen.
Joseph E. Johnston

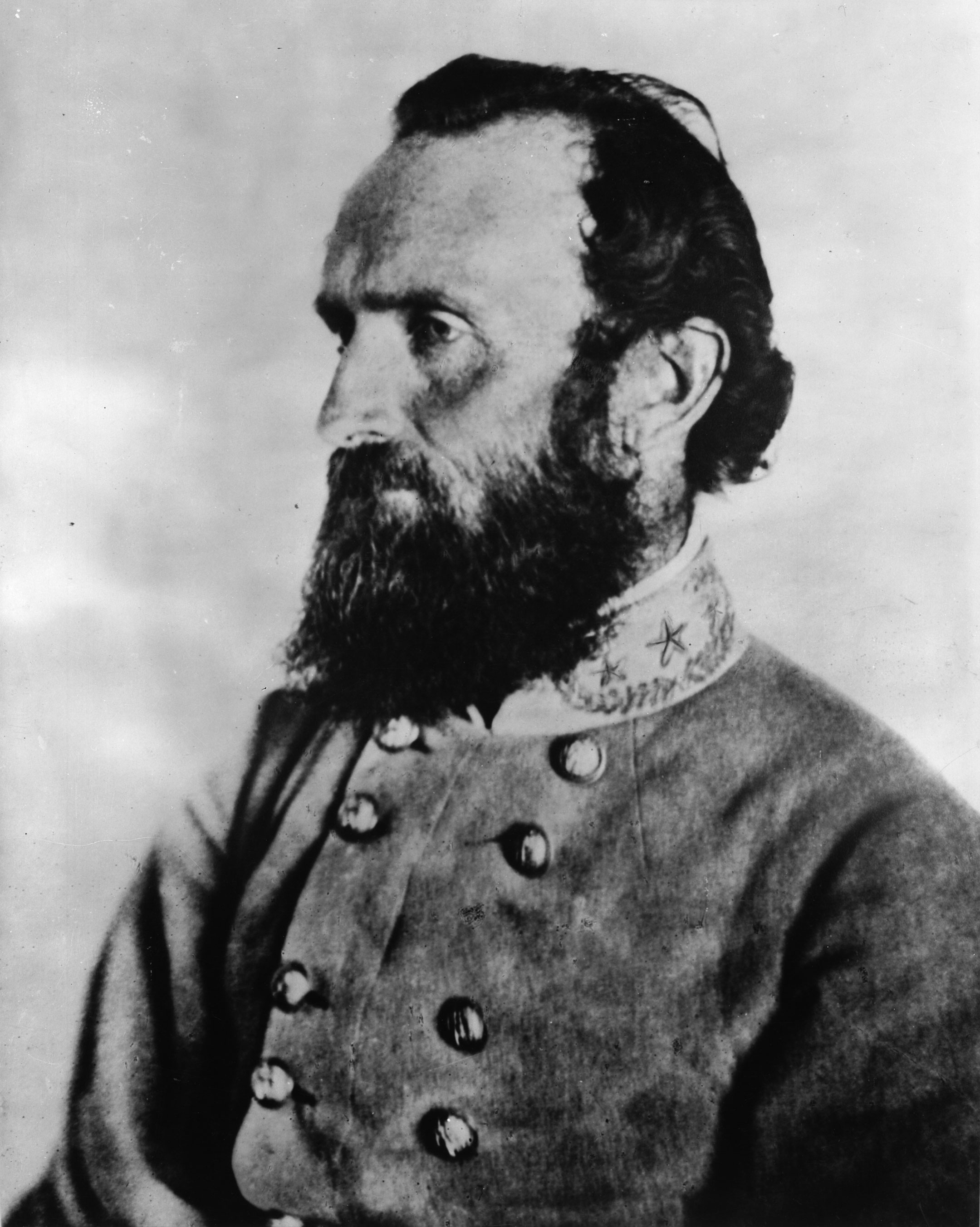
Lt. Gen.
Thomas J. Jackson

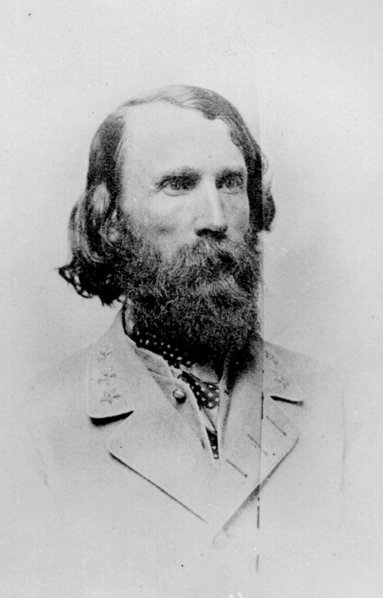
Lt. Gen.
A. P. Hill

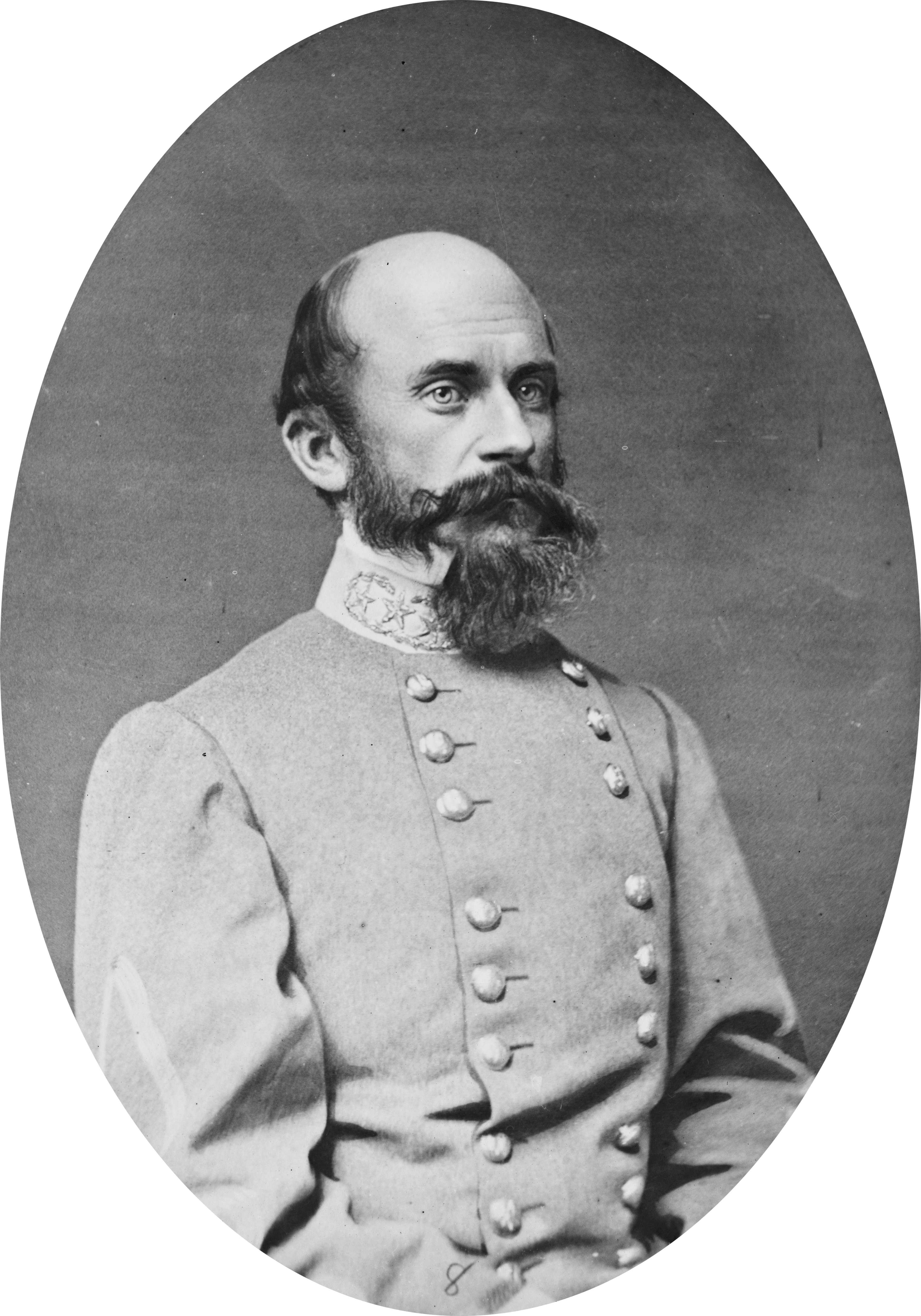
Lt. Gen.
Richard S. Ewell

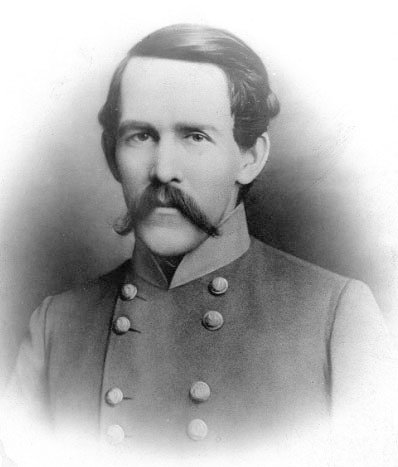
Maj. Gen.
Robert E. Rodes

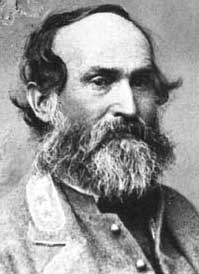
Lt. Gen.
Jubal A. Early

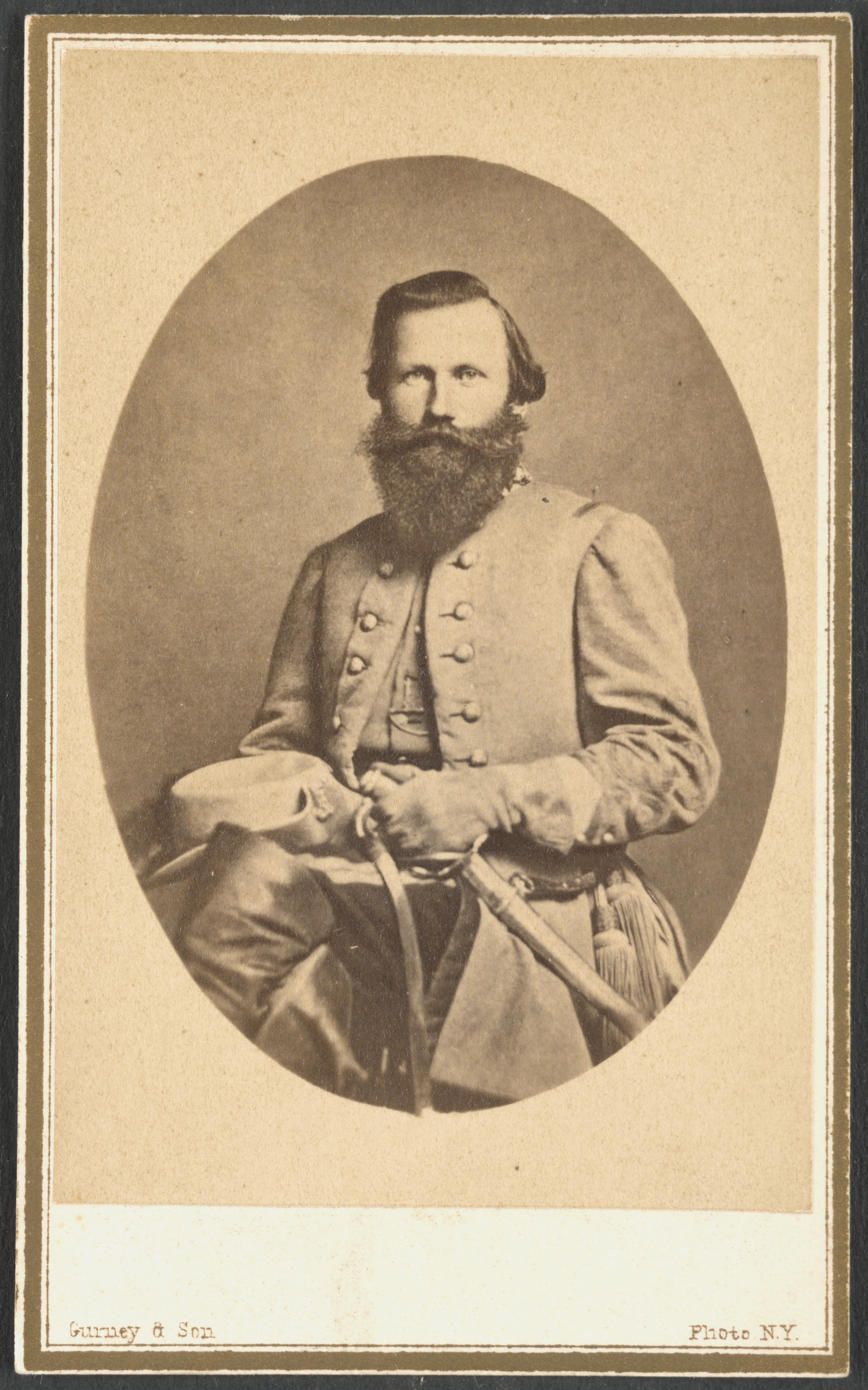
Maj. Gen.
J.E.B. Stuart

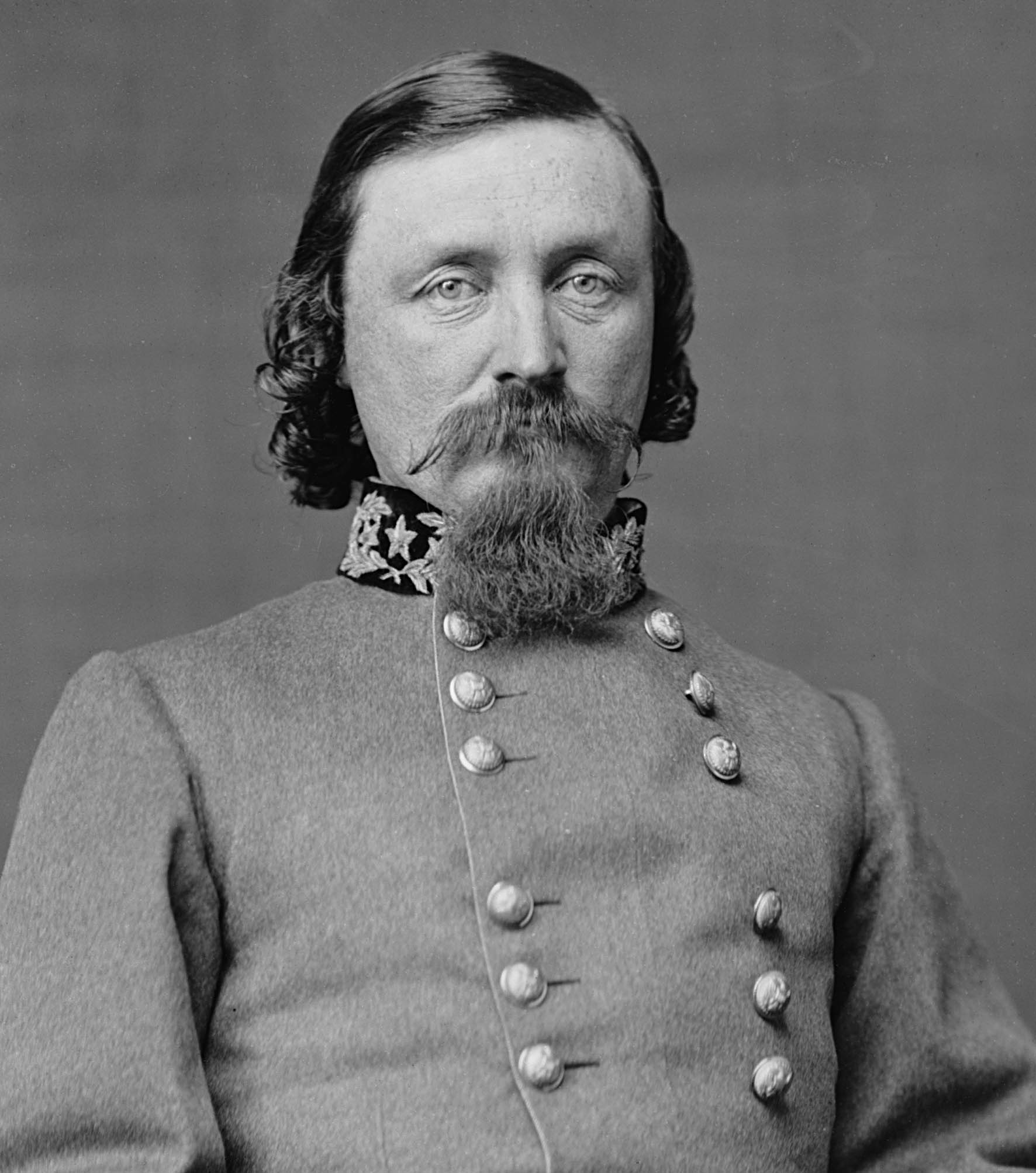
Maj. Gen.
George Pickett

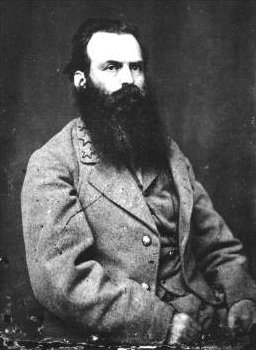
Maj. Gen.
James L. Kemper

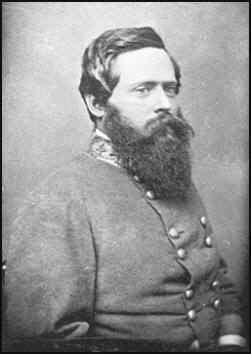
Maj. Gen.
Fitzhugh Lee

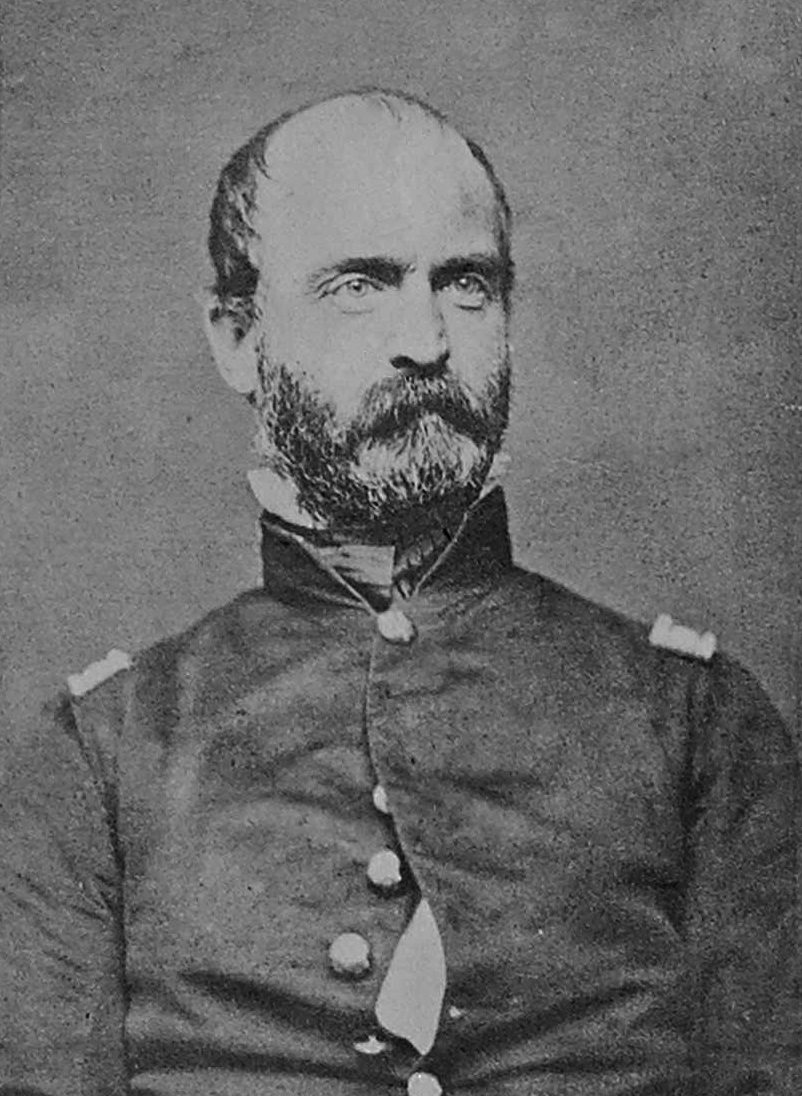
Brig. Gen.
Lewis A. Armistead

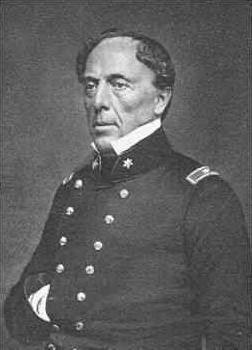
Brig. Gen. (frmr. Gov.)
John B. Floyd

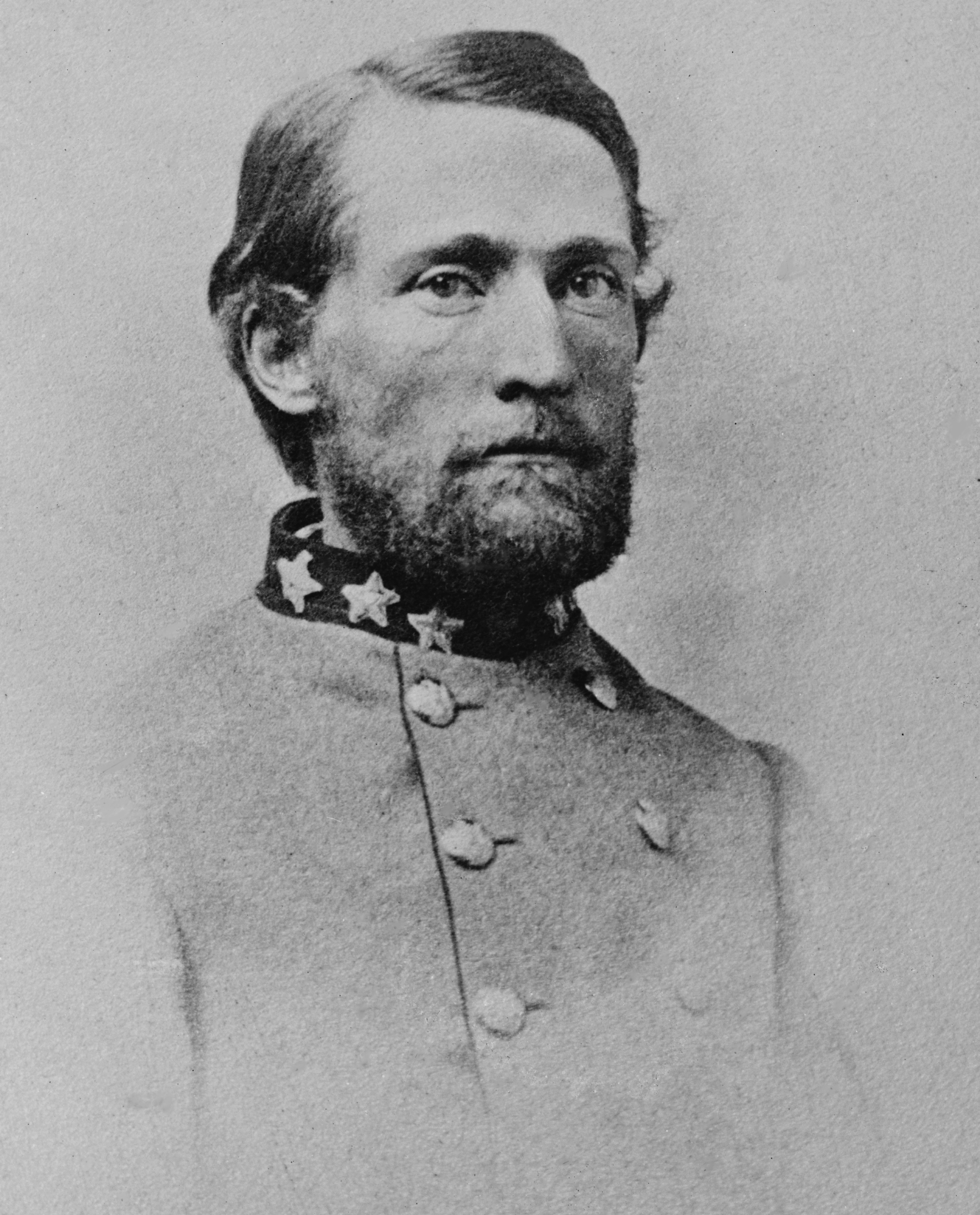
Col.
John S. Mosby

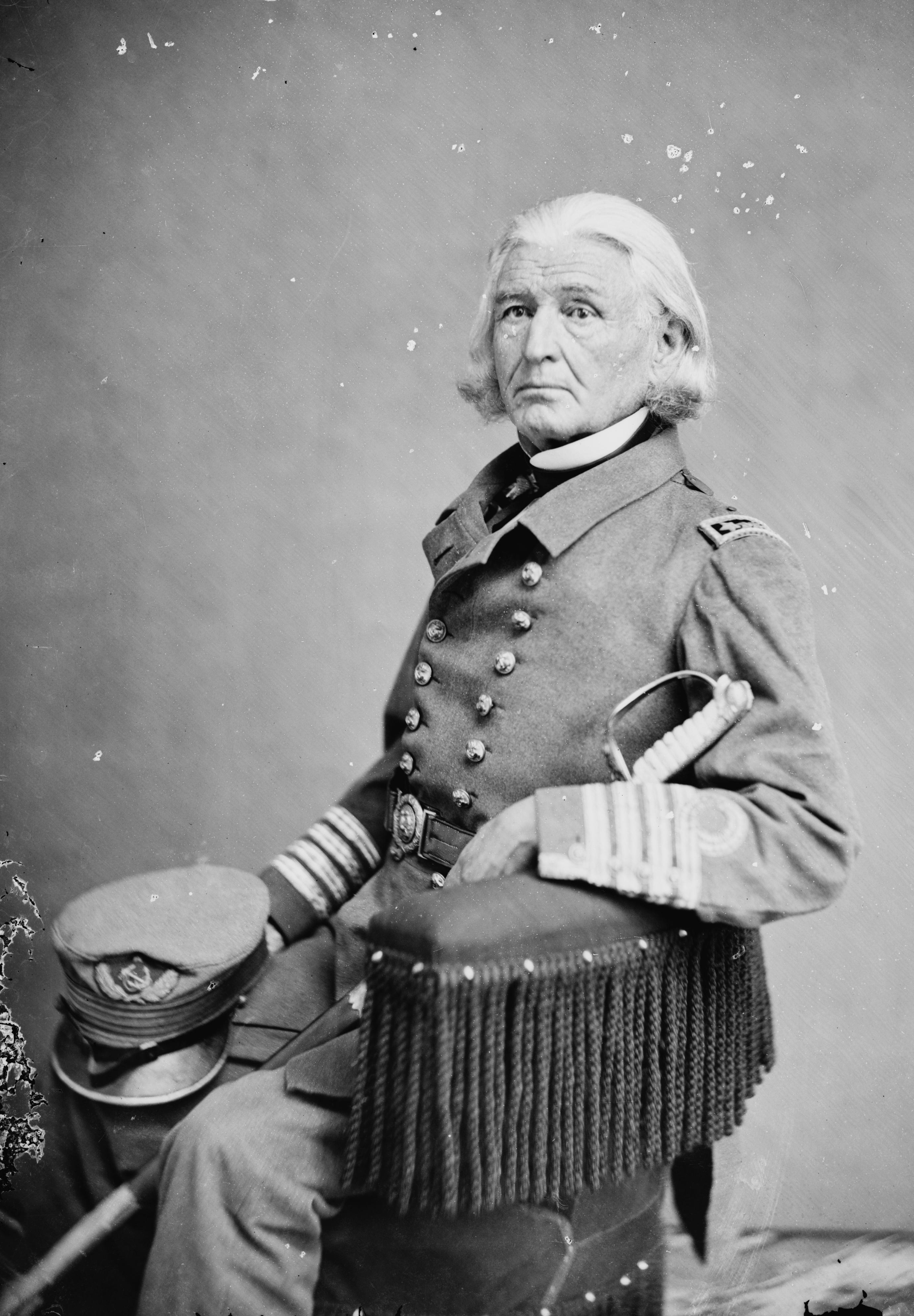
Captain, CSN
French Forrest

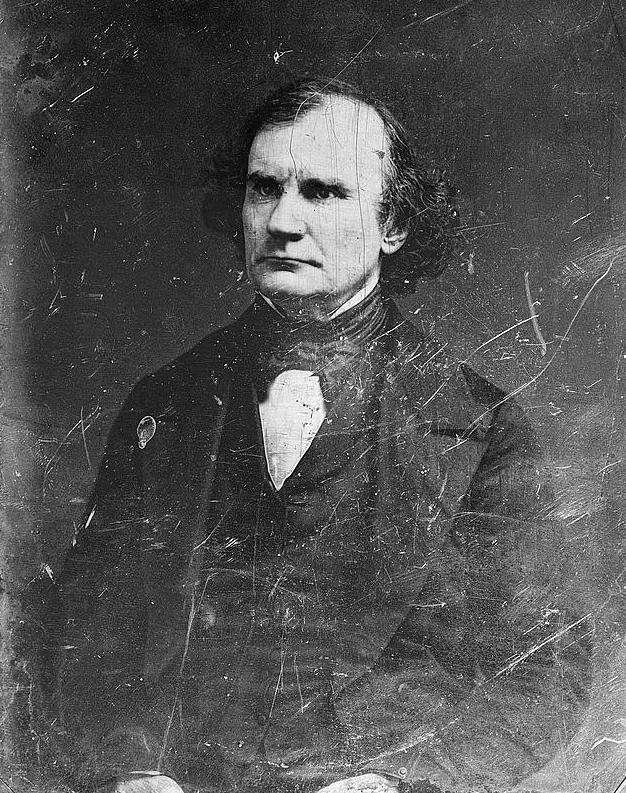
Commr. to U.K. & France
James Murray Mason

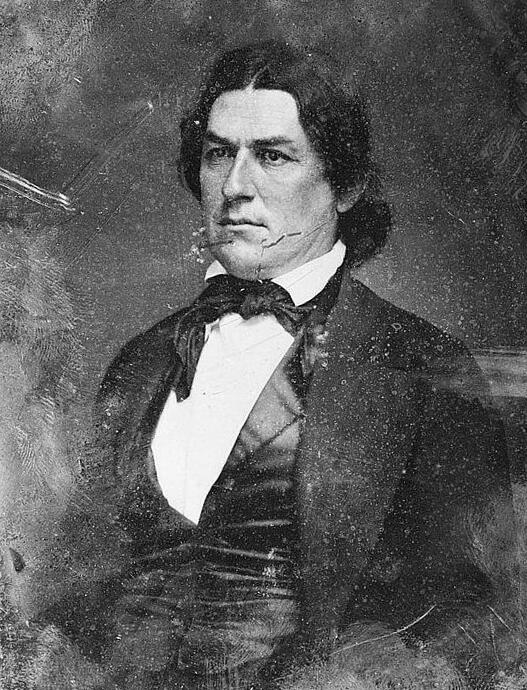
C.S. Sen.
Robert M. T. Hunter

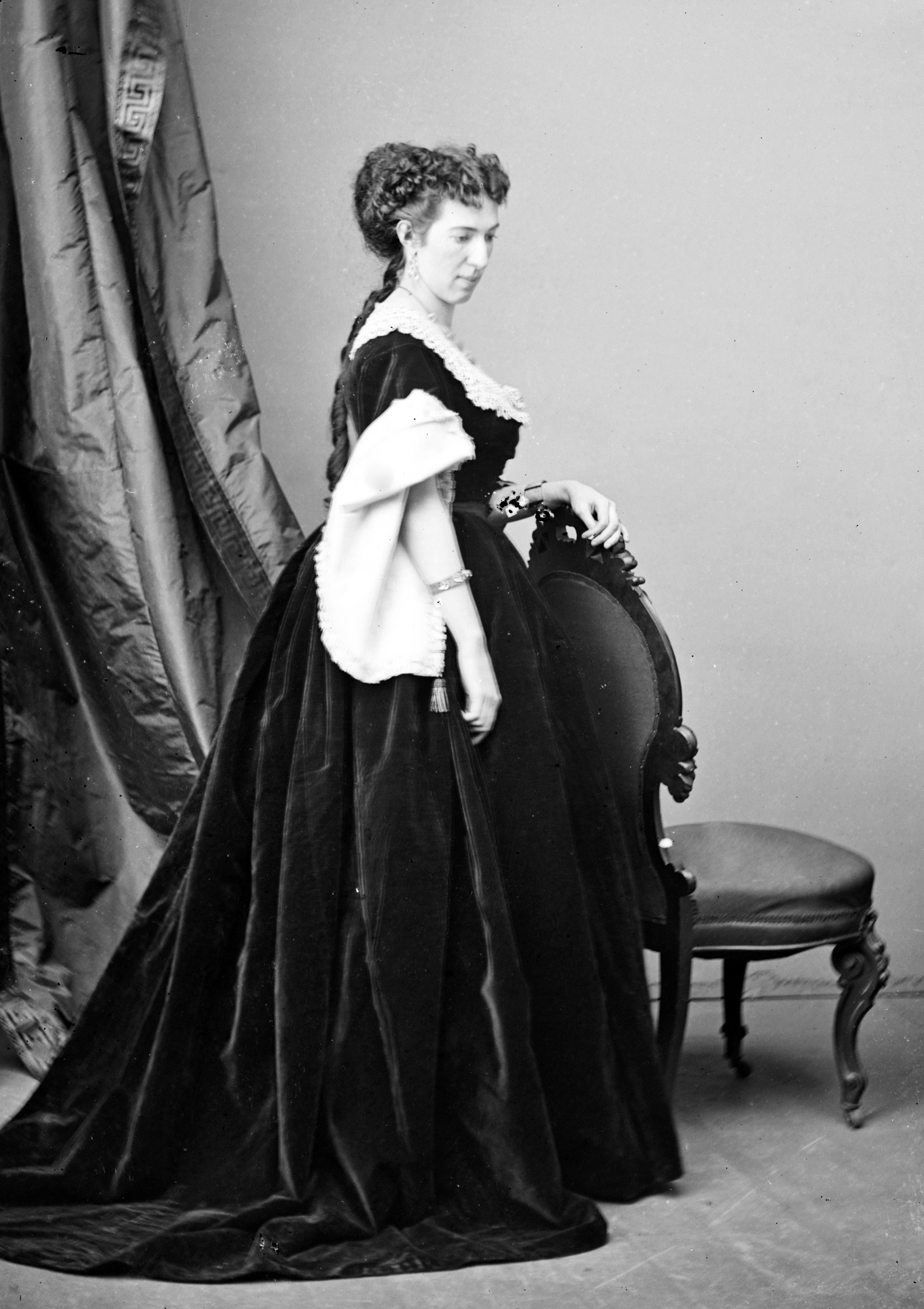
Spy
Belle Boyd

=== Notable pro-Union people from Virginia ===
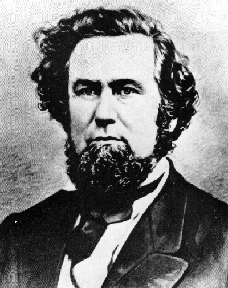
Gov.
Francis Harrison Pierpont

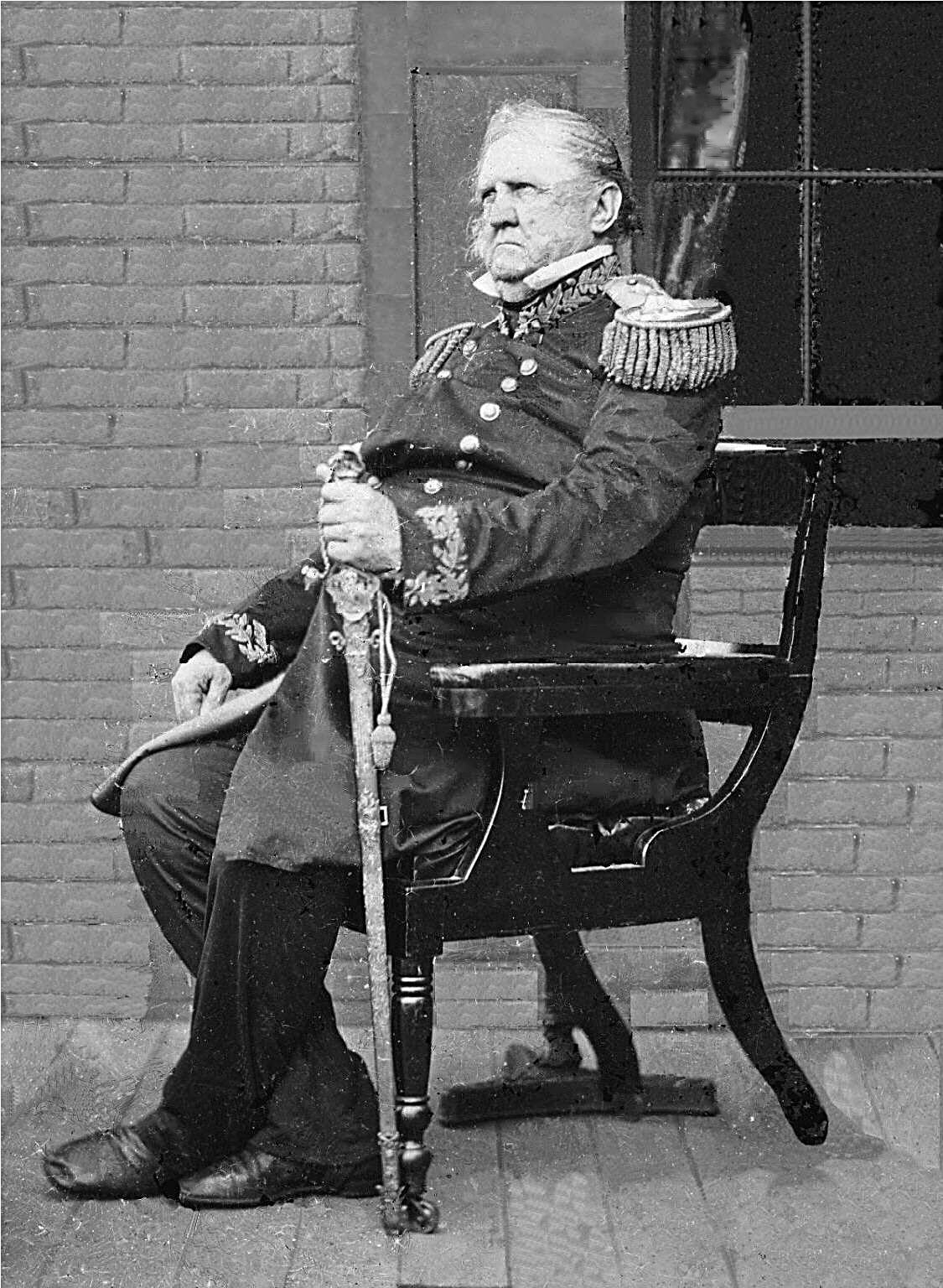
Lt. Gen.
Winfield Scott

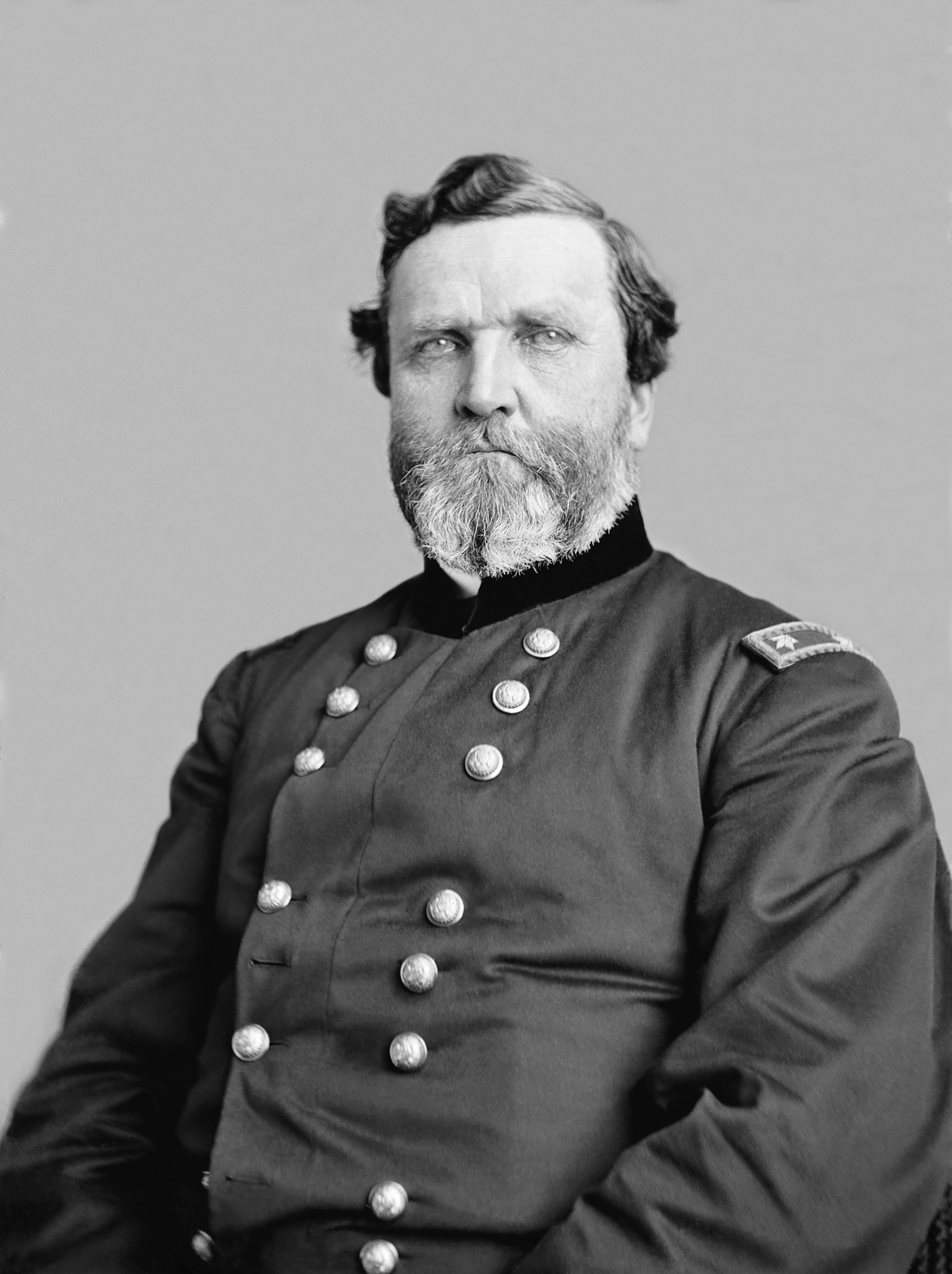
Maj. Gen.
George Henry Thomas

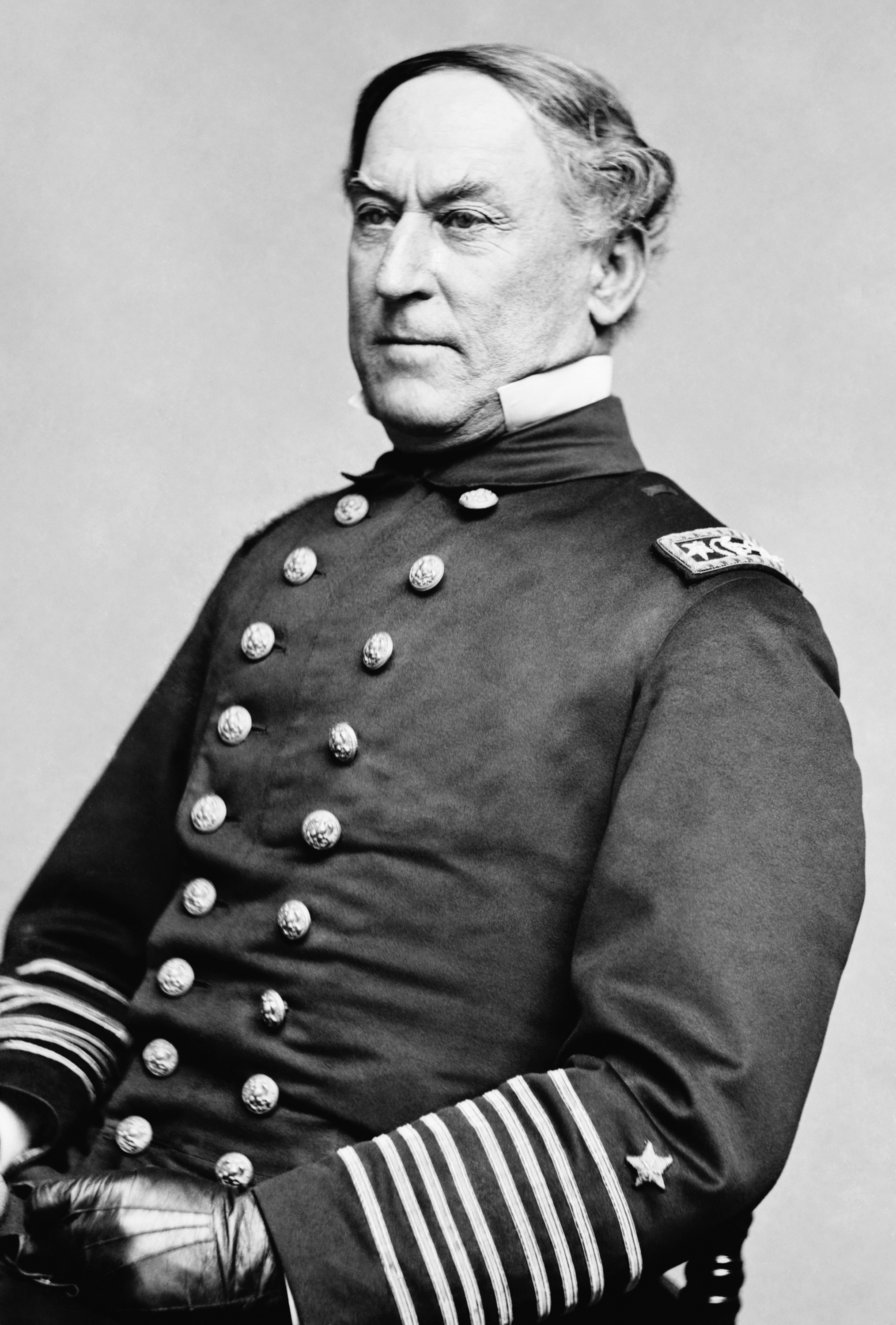
Adm.
David Farragut

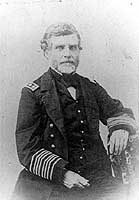
Rear Adm.
Samuel Phillips Lee

Rear Adm.
John Henry Upshur

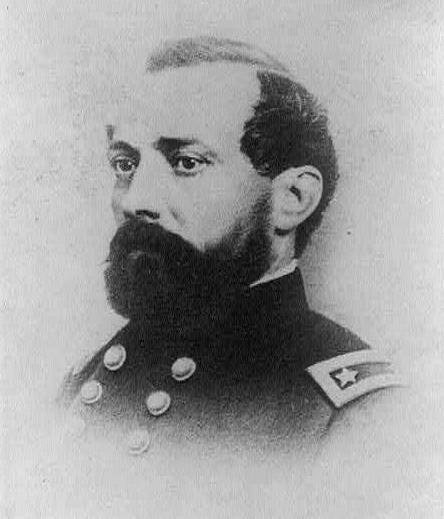
Maj. Gen.
Jesse Lee Reno

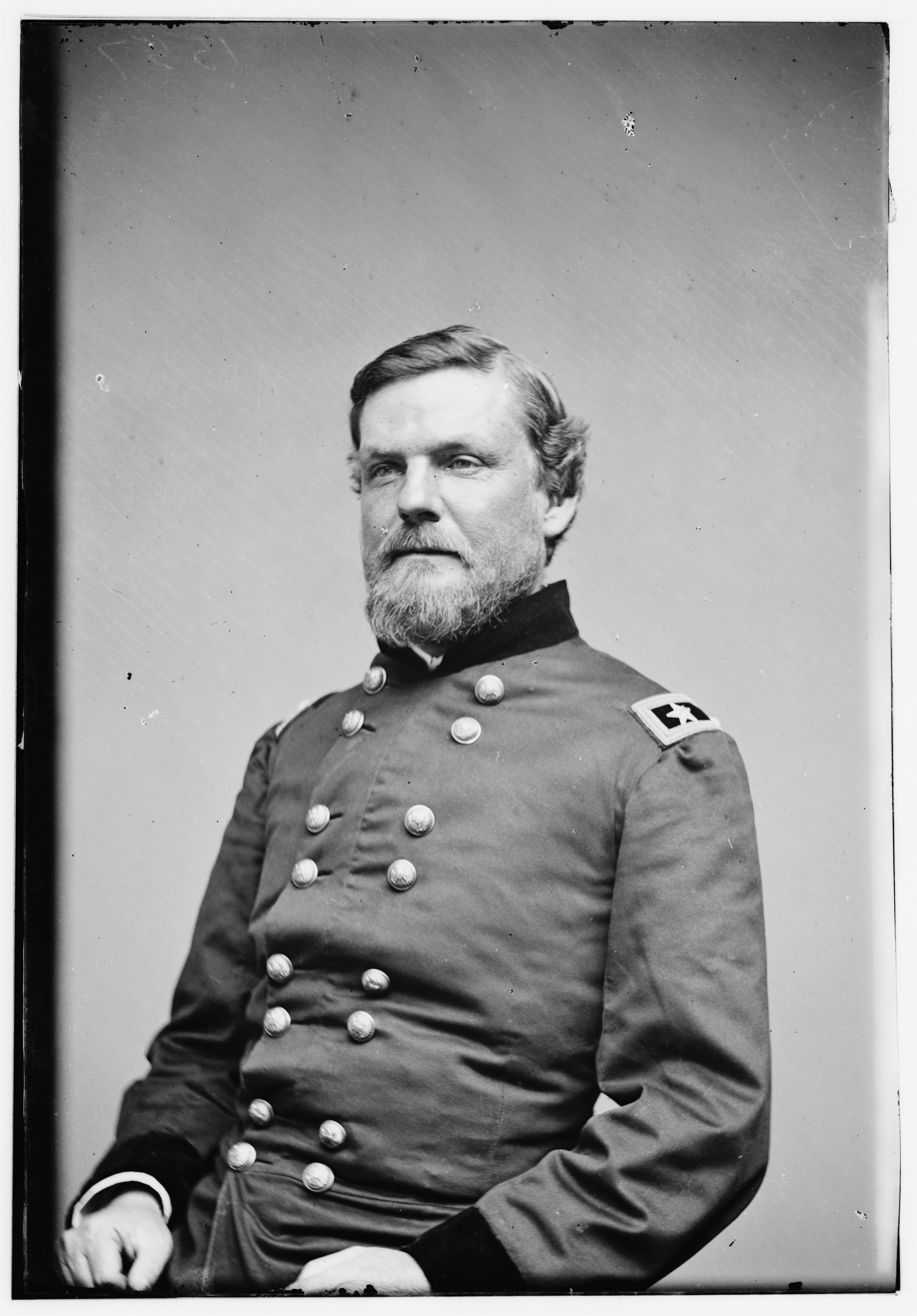
Maj. Gen.
John Newton

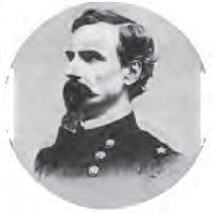
Brig. Gen.
John Davidson

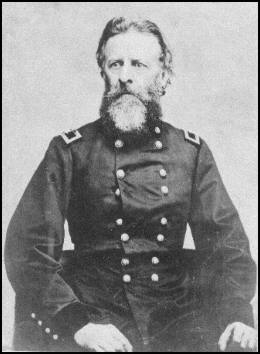
Brig. Gen.
Philip St. George Cooke

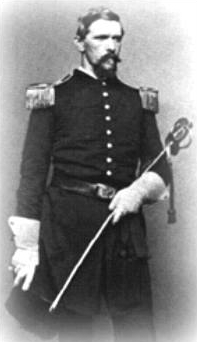
Brig. Gen.
William R. Terrill

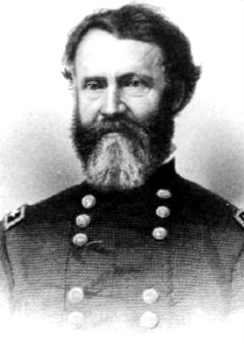
Brig. Gen.
Alexander Brydie Dyer

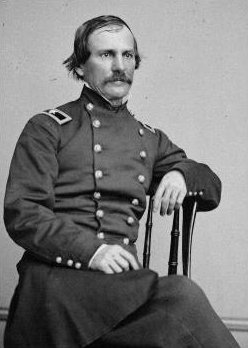
Brig. Gen.
William Hays

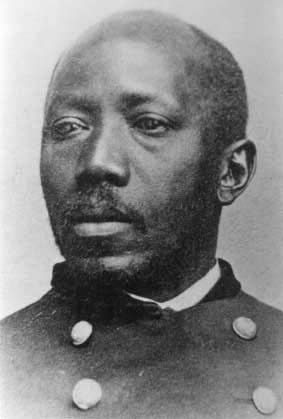
1st Black Officer Maj.
Martin Delany

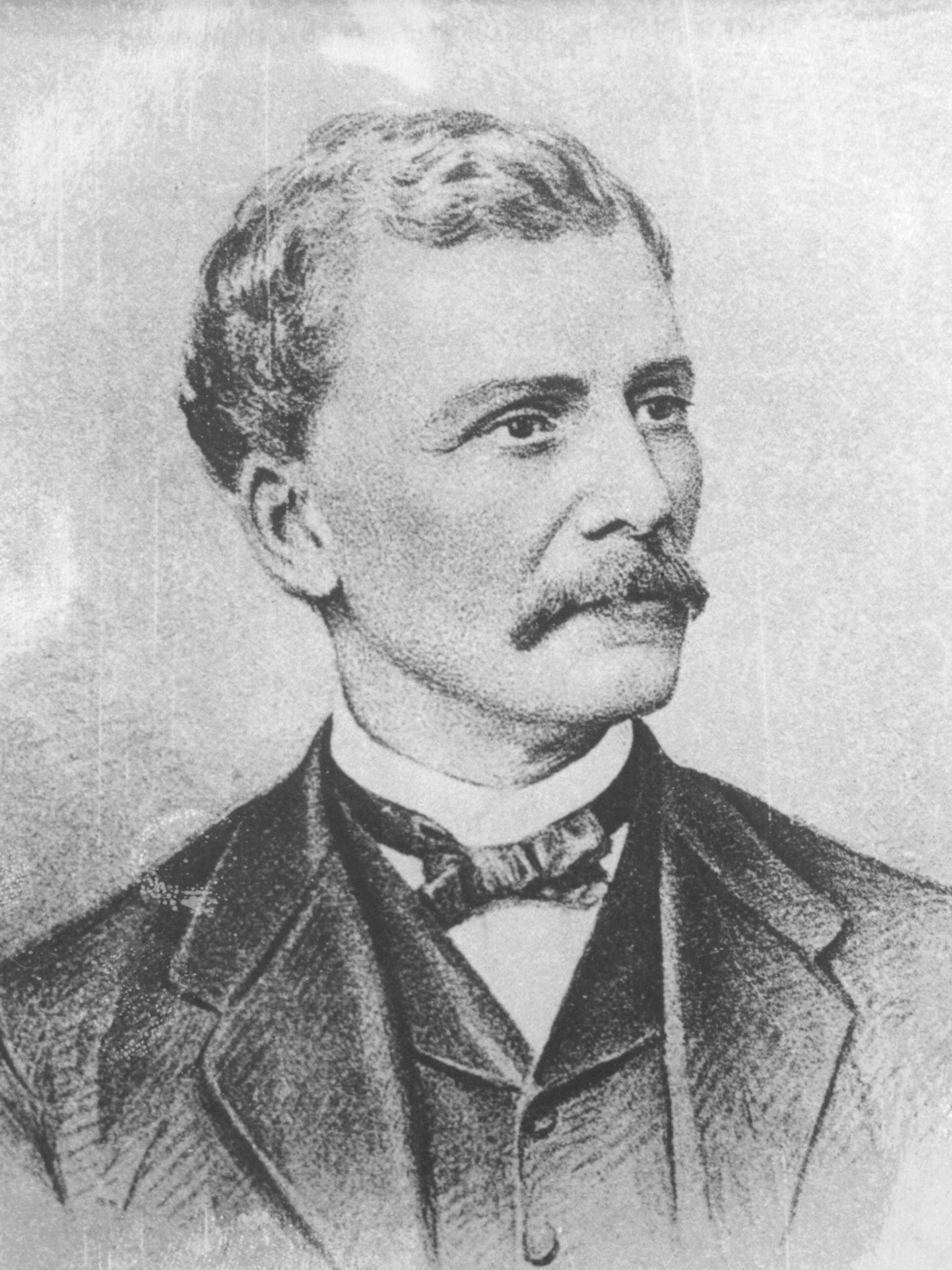
Army Judge Advocate
Major John F. Lee

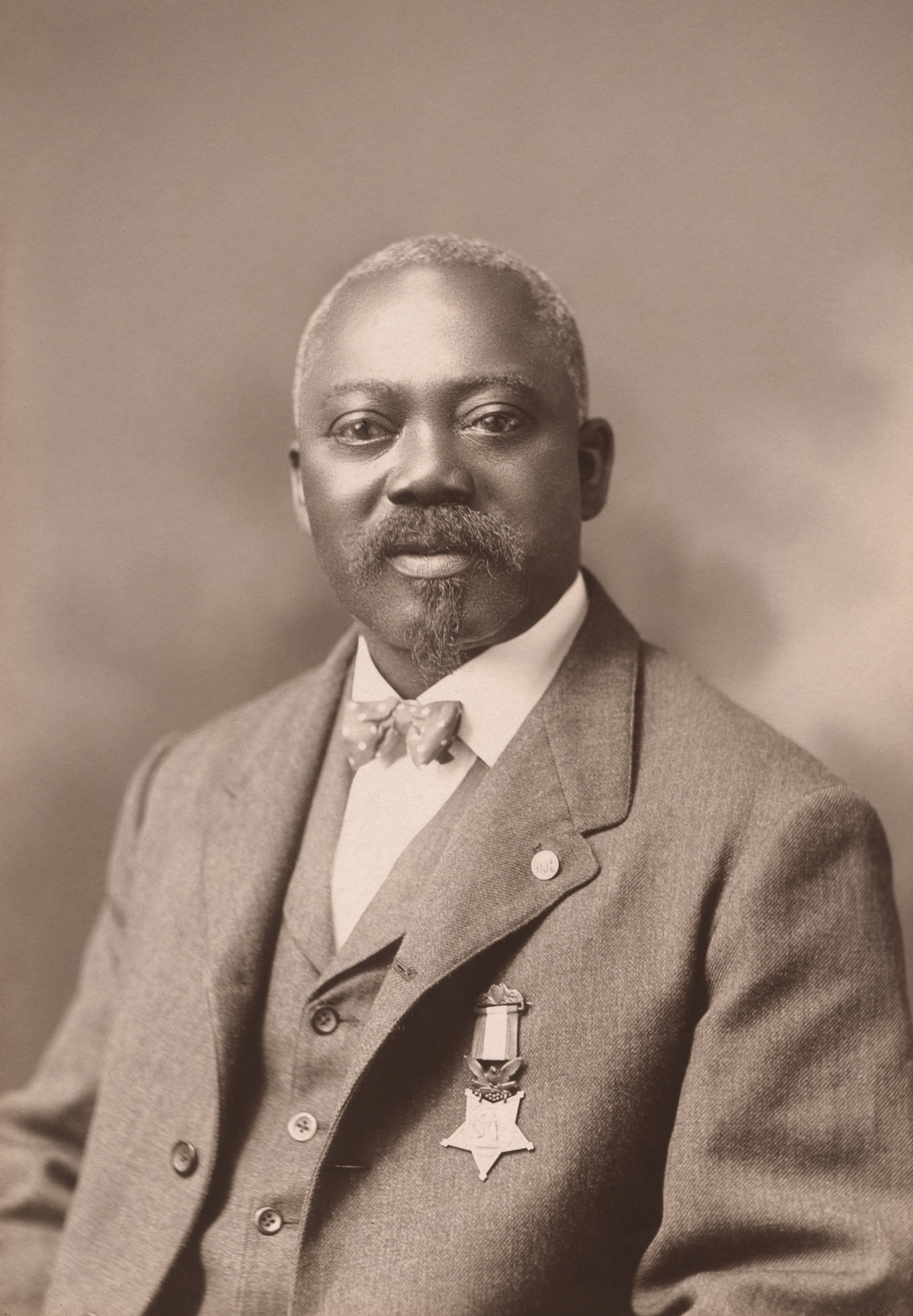
Medal of Honor Sgt.
William Harvey Carney

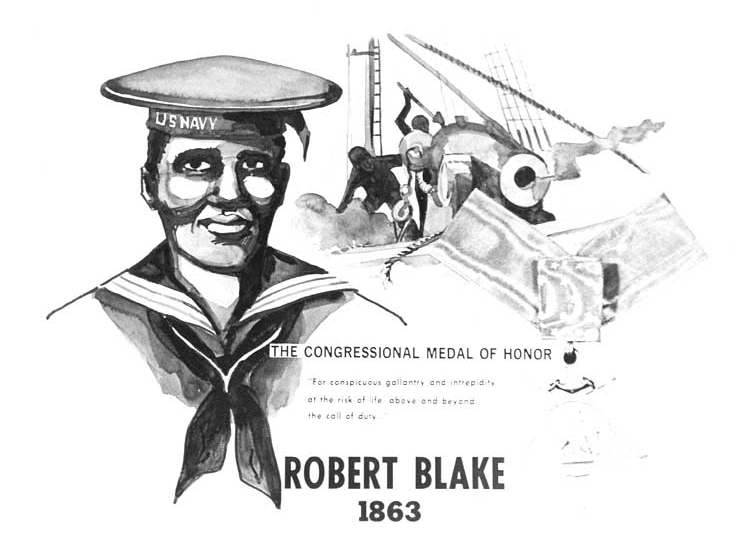
Seaman
Robert Blake (Medal of Honor)

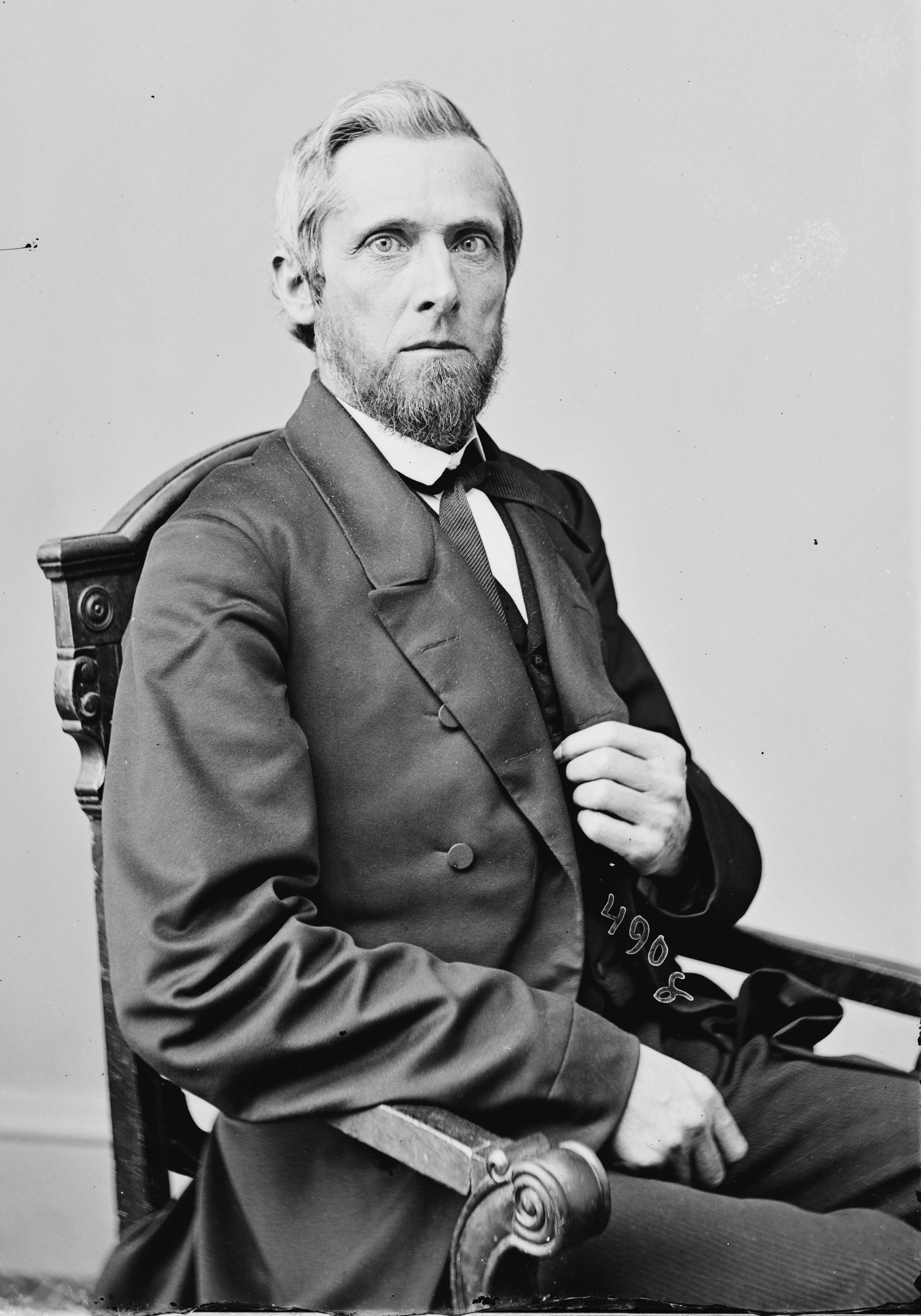
U.S. Sen.
Waitman T. Willey

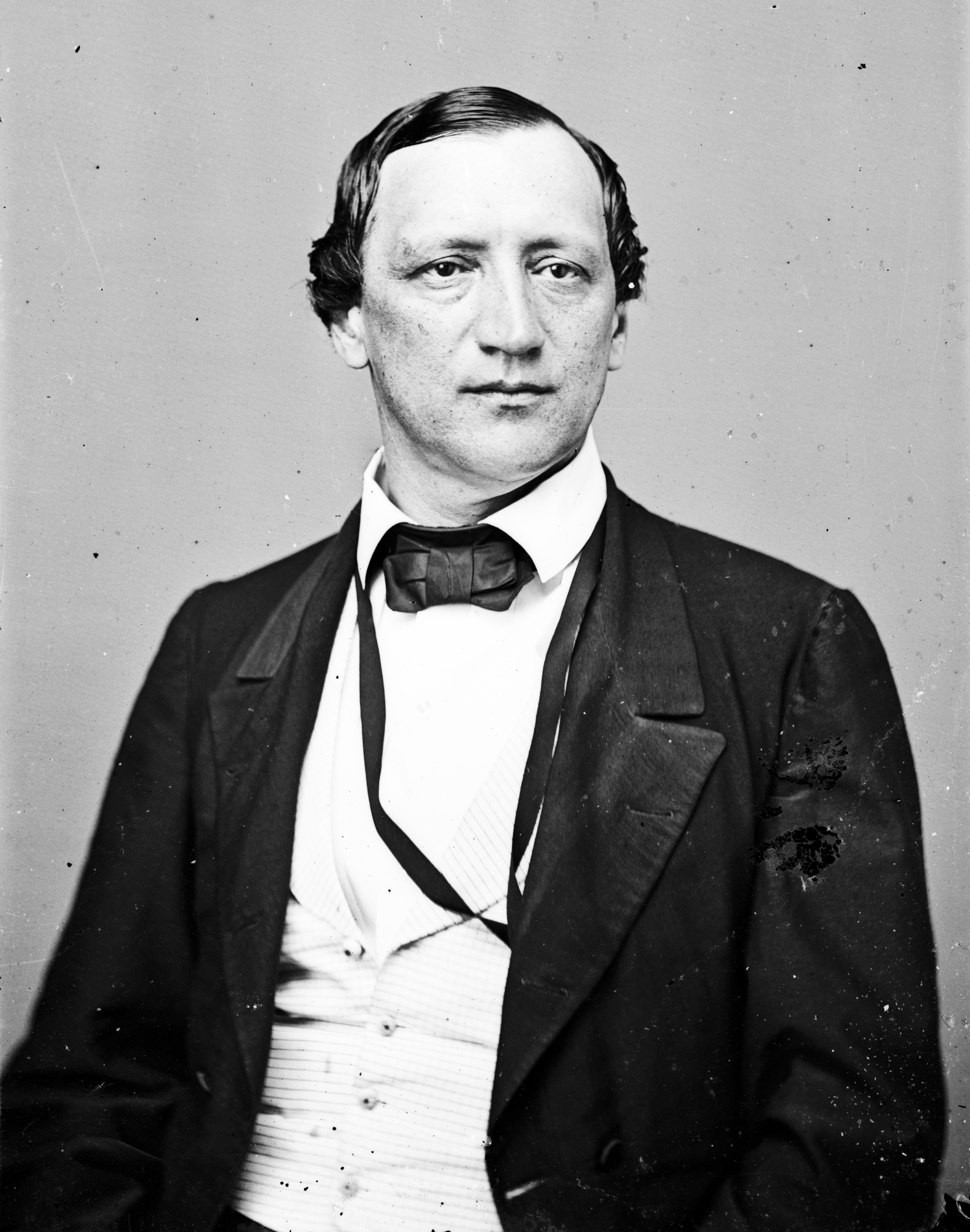
U.S. Sen.
John S. Carlile

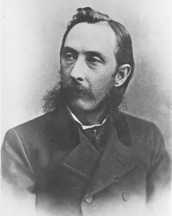
U.S. Sen.
Lemuel J. Bowden

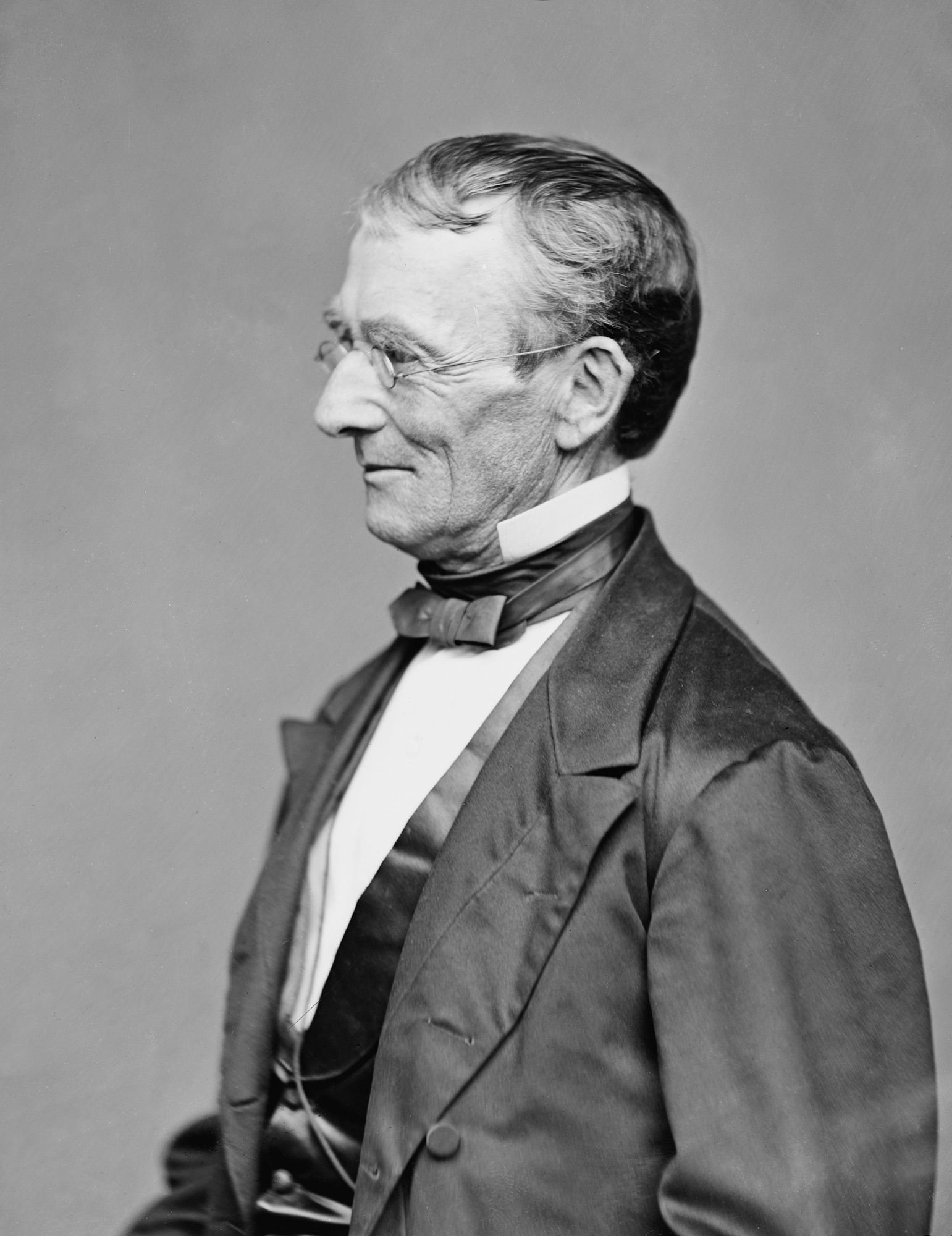
U.S. Rep.
Joseph Segar

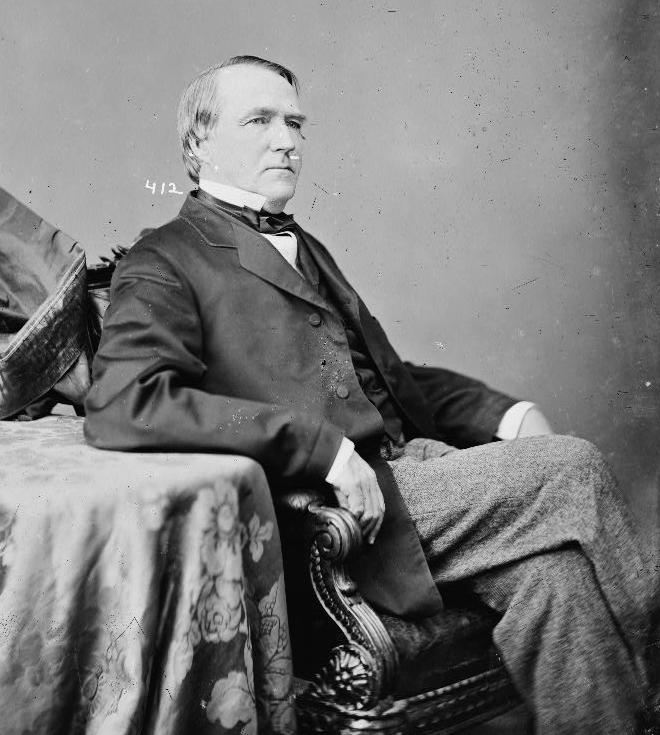
U.S. Rep.
Lewis McKenzie

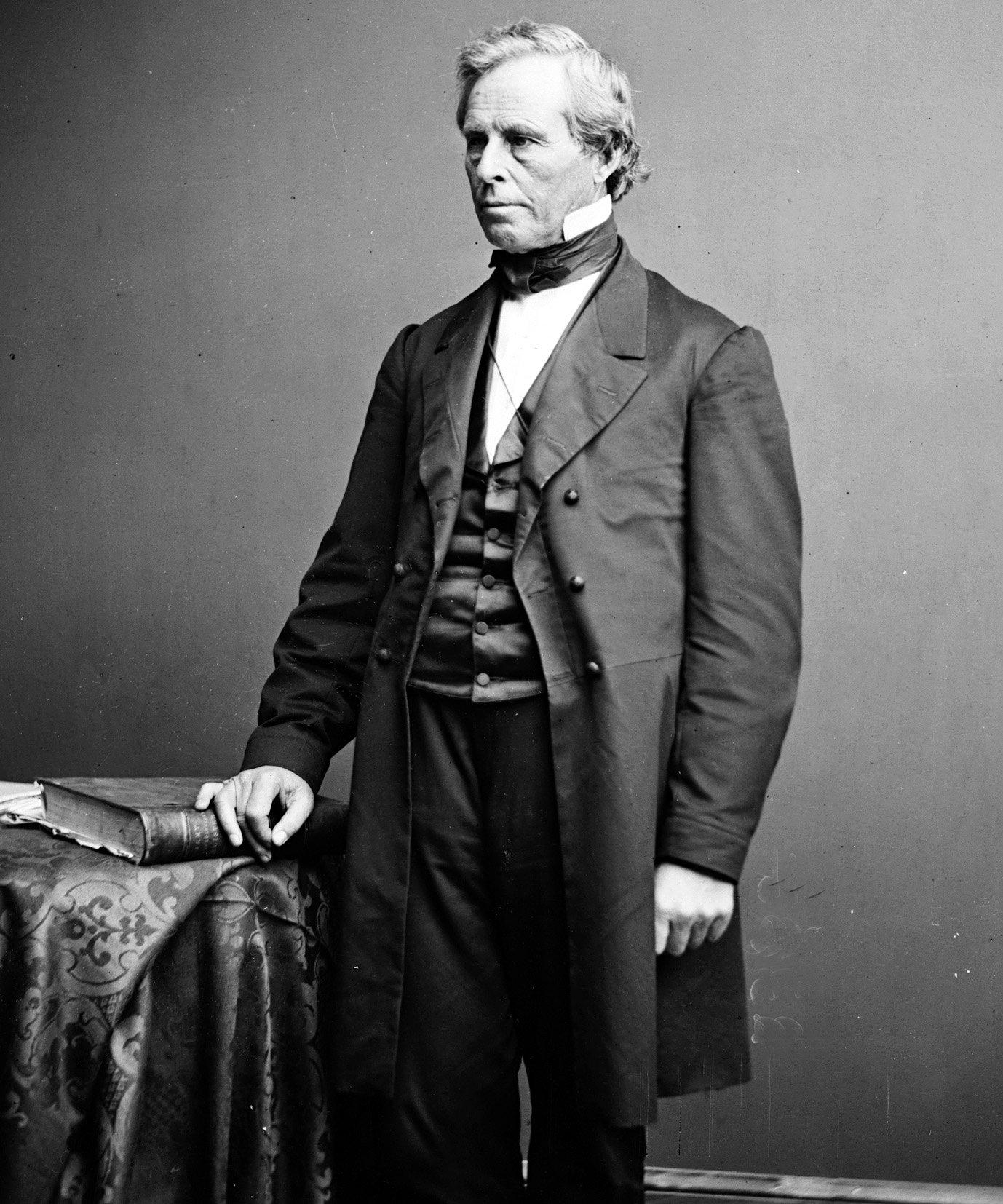
U.S. Rep.
William G. Brown Sr.

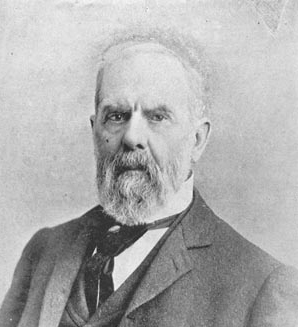
U.S. Rep.
Jacob B. Blair

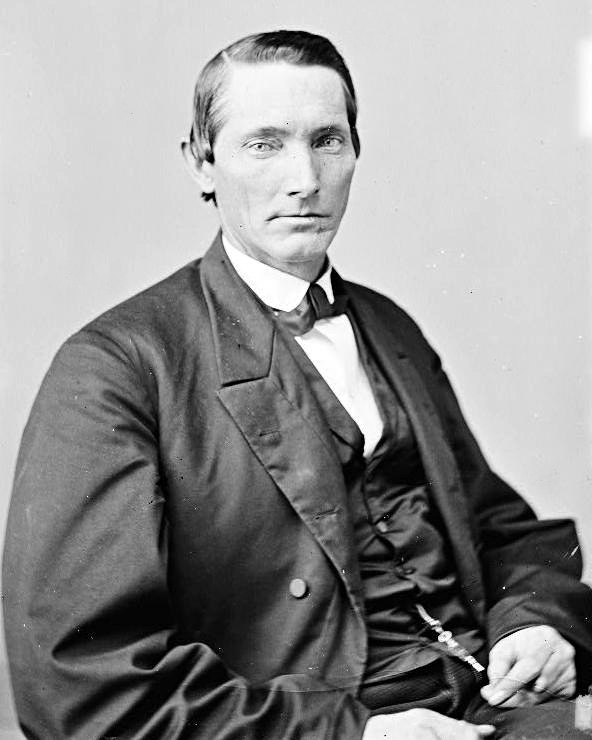
U.S. Rep.
Kellian Whaley

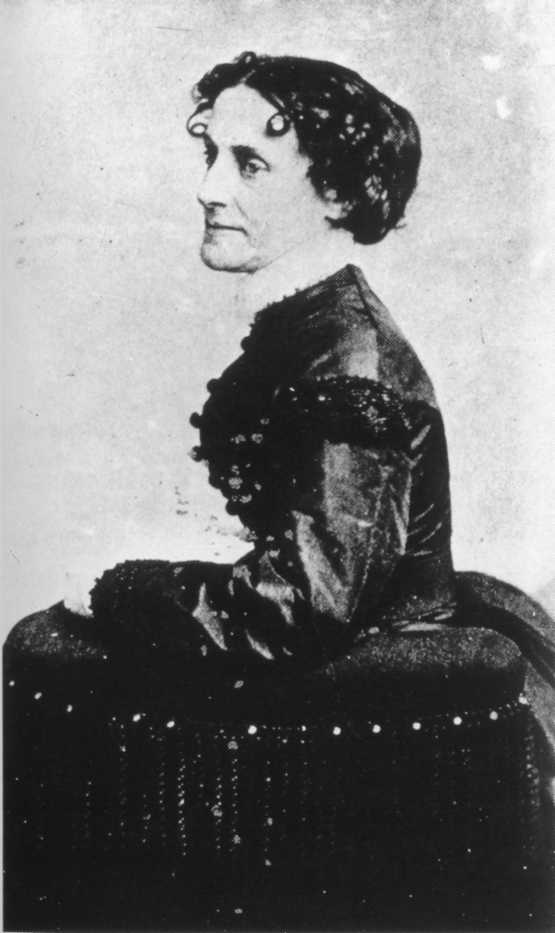
Abolitionist and Spy
Elizabeth Van Lew

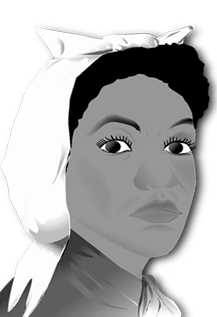
Spy
Mary Bowser

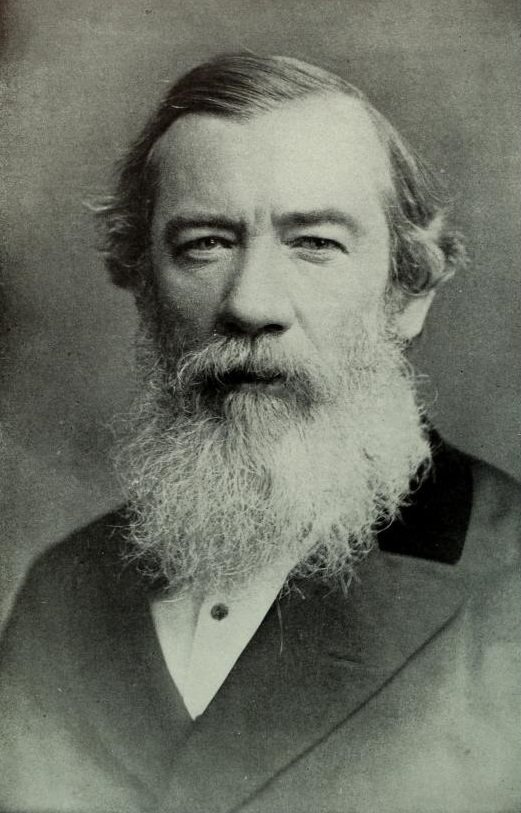
Abolitionist
Moncure Daniel Conway

== West Virginia enters the Union ==
On April 17, 1861, when the Richmond convention voted in favor of Virginia's secession from the United States, the 49 delegates that represented the 50 counties of the future state of West Virginia voted 32 to 13 against secession, with 4 delegates absent or abstaining. With the beginning of the war in western Virginia on May 26, however, most of the delegates returned to Richmond and signed the ordinance, 29 of the 49 delegates signed. A public vote to confirm the ordinance was held on May 23, 1861. Historian Richard O. Curry estimated the vote for West Virginia was approximately 34,677 against it and 19,121 in favor. He concluded that 24 counties favored secession and 26 opposed it.

The successive defeats of Confederate forces under the commands of Col. Porterfield, Gen. Robert Garnett and Robert E. Lee enabled the establishment of a Unionist government in Wheeling, one of Virginia's largest cities. Known as the Restored Government of Virginia, it was officially recognized by the Lincoln administration. Francis H. Pierpont was selected as governor of Virginia and a rump legislature was composed of former members of the Virginia Assembly who supported the Union. Many western members of the assembly however assumed their offices in Richmond, which reflected the deep divisions among the western counties. The Pierpont government found support among the counties along the Pennsylvania and Ohio borders and the counties along the B&O railroad line. In most of West Virginia however Pierpont's government was weak.

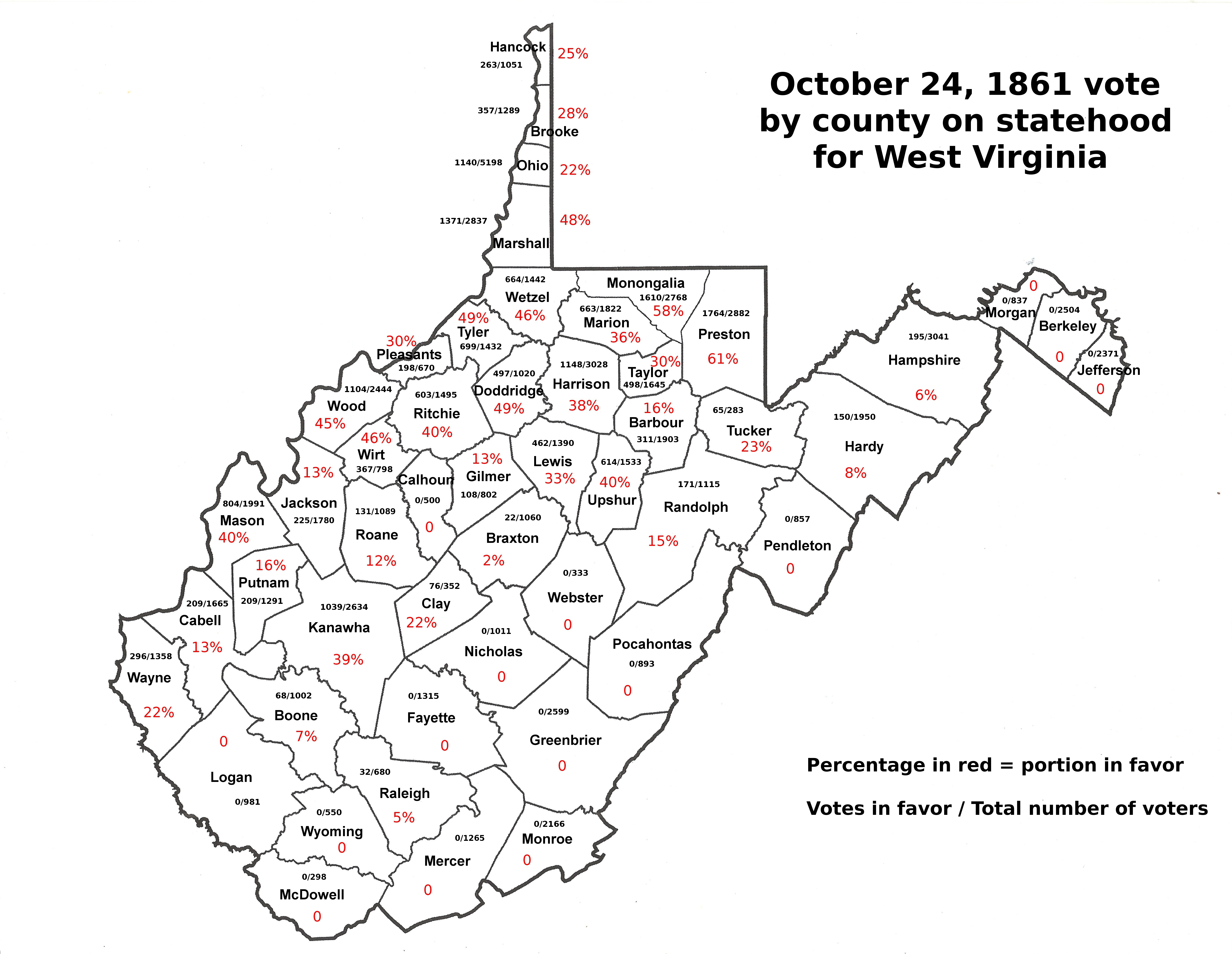
The county vote for West Virginia statehood on October 24, 1861

Military organizations for both the Union and Confederate governments began in May and June 1861, with Gov. Letcher ordering the muster of county militias and Pierpont doing the same for the Union. Many counties that had voted heavily against the secession ordinance nevertheless gave large numbers of men to the Confederate army. Due to the restricted enlistment for soldiers in Pennsylvania and Ohio many men not accepted in those states chose to join Pierpont's military organizations. The 1st and 2nd West Virginia Infantry and the 1st and 2nd West Virginia Cavalry were primarily composed of men from those states. Confederate enlistments began for the 8th Virginia Cavalry, 31st Virginia Infantry, 25th Virginia Infantry, and several regiments in the Stonewall Brigade. West Virginia provided about 20,000 soldiers each to the Union and the Confederacy.

An ordinance for separate statehood from Virginia was passed by the Pierpont government for a public vote on October 24, 1861. Turnout was low, with 18,408 voters approving. The 1860 census recorded 79,515 men of voting age in the 50 counties, and turnout was low for all of the Wheeling initiatives. The last necessary vote for statehood was held on March 4, 1863, with a turnout of 28,318, which included the soldier votes, approving the Willey amendment to the new state constitution.

The new state was formally admitted to the Union on June 20, 1863.

== Demographics ==
Virginia's Confederate government fielded about 155,000 troops in the American Civil War, more than any other state within the Confederacy. They came from all economic and social levels, including some Unionists and former Unionists. However, at least 30,000 of these men were actually from other states. Most of these non-Virginians were from Maryland, whose government was controlled by Unionists during the war. Another 20,000 of these troops were from what would become the State of West Virginia in August 1863. Important Confederates from Virginia included General Robert E. Lee, commander of the Army of Northern Virginia, General Stonewall Jackson (born in what became West Virginia), General J.E.B. Stuart, General A.P. Hill, and General Jubal Early.

Around 27,000 Virginians in total served in the Union Army. These were roughly 21,000 white Virginians (including West Virginians), and roughly 6,000 Virginians of African ancestry. Some of these men served in Maryland units. The U.S. provost marshal's estimate for West Virginia included large numbers of Ohioans and Pennsylvanians serving as "Virginians", but a recent soldier count has determined that about 20,000 were from West Virginia. Some African Americans, both freedmen and runaway slaves, enlisted in states as far away as Massachusetts. Areas of Virginia that supplied Union soldiers and sent few men to fight for the Confederacy, were those that had few or no slaves, a high percentage of poor families, and a history of opposition to secession. These areas were mainly located in northwestern Virginia. 40% of Virginia's officers in the United States military when the war started stayed and fought for the Union. These men included Winfield Scott, General-in-Chief of the Union Army; David G. Farragut, First Admiral of the Union Navy; and General George Henry Thomas.

At least one Virginian actually served in both the Confederate and Union armies. At the beginning of the war, a Confederate soldier from Fairfax County approached the Union soldiers guarding Chain Bridge in his Confederate uniform. Asked what he was doing trying to cross the bridge, he responded that he was travelling to Washington, D.C., to see his uncle. The perplexed Union soldiers asked who his uncle was, and the soldier replied his name is Uncle Sam. He was quickly enlisted as a Union scout due to his knowledge of the local terrain.

== Aftermath ==
Numerous battlefields and sites have been partially or fully preserved in Virginia. Those managed by the Federal government include Manassas National Battlefield Park, Richmond National Battlefield Park, Fredericksburg and Spotsylvania National Military Park, Cedar Creek and Belle Grove National Historical Park, Petersburg National Battlefield, Appomattox Court House National Historical Park.

A bill to remove Civil War monuments in Virginia advanced on February 3, 2020, after civil rights activists called for eliminating Civil War statues and Confederate monuments that tied cities to a legacy of racism and slavery.

== See also ==
- Army of Northern Virginia
- Confederate States of America States (animated map of secession and confederacy)
- Virginia Units in the Civil War

Preceded by Florida	List of C.S. states by date of admission to the Confederacy; Admitted on May 7, 1861 (8th)	Succeeded by Arkansas
