= Battle of Lynchburg =

Battle of the American Civil War

Coordinates: 37.3845°N 79.1832°W

- Part of the American Civil War
- Lynchburg, Virginia
| Date | June 17, 1864 – June 18, 1864 |
| Location | Lynchburg, Virginia |
| Result | Confederate victory |

Belligerents
| United States (Union) | CSA (Confederacy) |

Commanders and leaders
| David Hunter | Jubal Early; John C. Breckinridge |

Units involved
| Dept. of West Virginia | Second Corps, Army of N.VA; Breckinridge's Division; Various cavalry units |

Strength
| 16,643 | 14,000* |

Casualties and losses
| 700 (estimated) | 200 (estimated) |
- Only a portion of the Second Corps arrived in time to fight in the battle. The entire Second Corps was available for the post-battle pursuit, which would increase the Confederate strength of 14,000. Union casualties totaling 938 are for the period of June 10 - June 23.

The Battle of Lynchburg was fought on June 17–18, 1864, as part of the American Civil War. Over 30,000 soldiers were at the battle, and fighting took place outside of Lynchburg, Virginia. The Union Army of West Virginia, commanded by Major General David Hunter, attempted to capture the city. Hunter took too much time moving his force to Lynchburg; allowing Confederate reinforcements time to arrive to defend the city. Hunter was repulsed by troops under the command of Confederate Lieutenant General Jubal Early. A portion of Early's troops arrived on the first day the battle. Following the battle, Confederate troops pursued the Union army as it retreated into West Virginia.

Lynchburg was important to the Confederate Army. It had three railroads, a navigable canal, military hospitals, and was a distribution center for food and military supplies. Telecommunication lines strung along the railroads enabled Confederate military headquarters in Richmond to communicate with regional headquarters in western Virginia and Tennessee. Because of its importance, Lieutenant General Ulysses S. Grant wanted Hunter to attack the city and its railroads.

Hunter retreated west into West Virginia after his defeat at Lynchburg. This left the Shenandoah Valley open to the Confederate Army down to Maryland. Early moved down the valley and threatened Washington, DC, until his defeat in the Battle of Fort Stevens on July 11–12. After this battle, which took place less than four miles (6.4 km) from the White House, Early began a retreat back to the Shenandoah Valley. On July 30, cavalry sent by Early, and commanded by Brigadier General John McCausland, moved into Pennsylvania and burned the city of Chambersburg.

== Background ==
=== Grant's plan ===
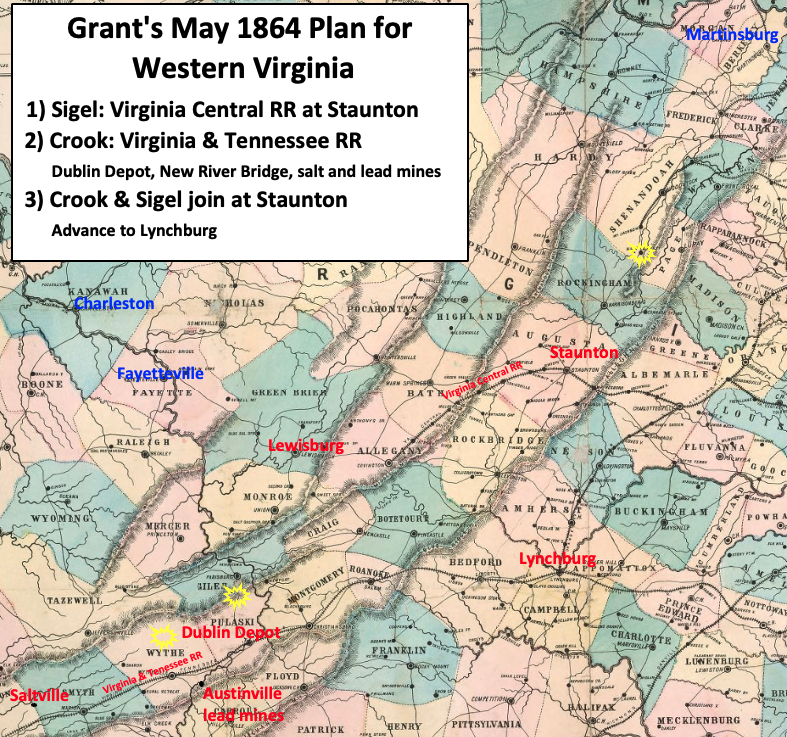
Union Army plan to attack Confederate assets in western Virginia

During March 1864, Lieutenant General Ulysses S. Grant became commander of all Union armies. Grant's strategy in Virginia was to attack the strongest Confederate army, Robert E. Lee's Army of Northern Virginia, on multiple fronts. In western Virginia, Grant targeted Lee's support system. Western Virginia provided food and supplies for Lee's army that was positioned near Richmond. Two key depots were Staunton and Lynchburg, which were 99 miles (159 km) apart—and both were over 120 miles (190 km) west of the Confederate capital of Richmond. Both towns were located on railroad lines that were used to transport troops in addition to supplies, so the railroads were also targets for the Union Army.

In the case of Lynchburg, it was the eastern terminus of the Virginia & Tennessee Railroad, and also had the Orange & Alexandria Railroad and South Side Railroad that could be used to get to Richmond. The James River and Kanawha Canal was navigable between Lynchburg and Richmond, offering another (although slower) mode for transportation. Telegraph line enabled communication between Richmond and Lynchburg, and between Lynchburg and Knoxville, Tennessee. Lynchburg was also the storage site for medical supplies and the home of multiple hospitals.

The Union plan of attack had Major General Franz Sigel leading the Army of the Shenandoah south in the Shenandoah Valley to capture Staunton, which was a stop for the Virginia Central Railroad. An army located in West Virginia, led by Brigadier General George Crook, would attack the Virginia and Tennessee Railroad. A small force of cavalry from Crook's army, led by Brigadier General William W. Averell, would attack the same railroad further west, including some salt mines located on a branch line. Crook and Averell would join Siegel at Staunton after the missions were completed. Then the combined force would attack Lynchburg.

==== Failure in western Virginia ====
Sigel departed from Martinsburg, West Virginia, on April 29. Siegel did not reach Staunton because he was defeated on May 15 in the Battle of New Market by a Confederate army led by Major General John C. Breckinridge. After the battle, Siegel retreated north to Cedar Creek. Breckinridge was summoned east to assist Lee's army, and his division joined Lee on May 20.

Further west, Crook won the Battle of Cloyd's Mountain on May 9, and burned the Virginia & Tennessee's New River railroad bridge near Central Depot (northeast of Wytheville) on May 10. Averell chose not to attack the well-guarded salt mines, and was prevented from reaching the lead mines on May 10 in the Battle of Cove Mountain. (Note: Salt was used by the Army of Northern Virginia to preserve its food, and lead was used to manufacture its bullets.) Both Crook and Averell retreated toward a camp at Meadow Bluff, West Virginia, because they had not heard from Sigel. They reached the safety of Meadow Bluff on May 19.

=== Hunter takes command ===
Major General David Hunter replaced Siegel on May 21. On June 5, he moved south in the Shenandoah Valley and defeated Confederate forces in the Battle of Piedmont. Hunter, in his report, estimated that Confederate losses were 600 killed or wounded—and over 1,000 became prisoners. Among the Confederate casualties was the leader of the Confederate Army at Piedmont, Brigadier General William E. "Grumble" Jones, who was killed in action. On the next day Hunter moved his army into Staunton against no resistance. He spent the next few days destroying Confederate war materials while waiting for Crook to join him.

In a letter dated June 6, Lieutenant General Grant wrote to Hunter saying that he should attack the "Lynchburg branch of the Virginia Central" Railroad at Lynchburg. (Note: The Orange and Alexandria Railroad runs northeast from Lynchburg and connects with the Virginia Central Railroad at Charlottesville.) He also urged Hunter to destroy the canal (James River and Kanawha Canal) near Lynchburg. On June 8, Hunter was joined by Crook's Army of West Virginia, including cavalry commanded by Averell. The newcomers received badly needed supplies such as boots and uniforms. Hunter reorganized his combined cavalry into two divisions.

=== Confederate reaction to Piedmont ===
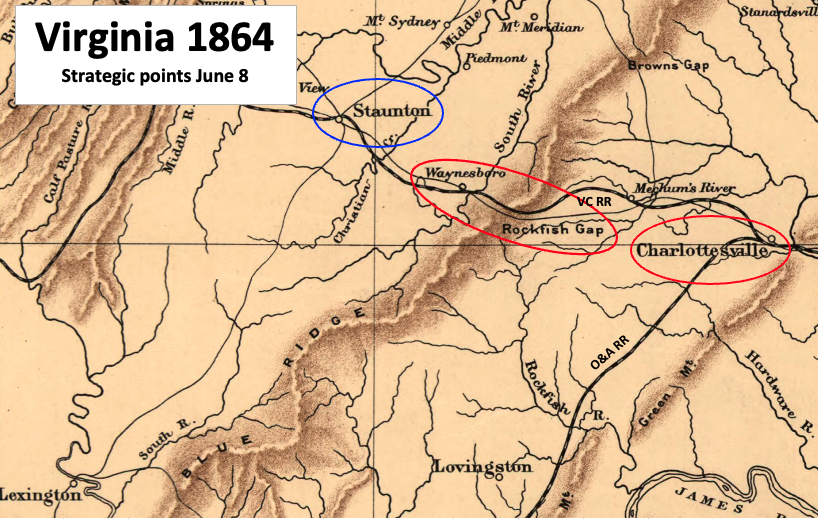
Confederate forces moved from Richmond toward Staunton

Lee's response to the defeat at Piedmont was to send Breckinridge with two brigades from the Richmond area to the Shenandoah Valley. (Note: Wharton's Brigade was commanded by Colonel Augustus Forsberg, and sometimes referred to as Forsberg's Brigade. Echol's Brigade was, in this case, commanded by Colonel George S. Patton Sr., and sometimes referred to as Patton's Brigade.) Breckinridge had been injured in an earlier battle when his horse fell upon him. On June 7 the two brigades, commanded by Brigadier General Gabriel C. Wharton, boarded railcars in Richmond without Breckinridge. They rode on trains until they were near Rockfish Gap and Waynesboro on the evening of June 8. Brigadier General John D. Imboden's cavalry and the remnants of Jones' army also were at Rockfish Gap.

Separate from Wharton's troops, Breckinridge arrived by rail in Charlottesville on the morning of June 9. He now had a total of about 5,000 infantry soldiers from Jones' defeated army and Wharton. Also available to Breckinridge was a cavalry brigade located further west under the command of Brigadier General John McCausland, which would increase the Confederate cavalry to about 4,000 riders. Breckinridge requested that Richmond send artillery for support. By June 10 Breckinridge had a temporary headquarters at Rockfish Gap, and received news that Hunter was moving south from Staunton.

== Opposing forces ==
=== Union ===
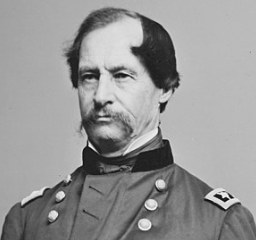
MG David Hunter

The Union force consisted of 16,643 fighters commanded by Major General David Hunter. (Note: The American Battlefield Trust lists the Union force as 16,643, while author Richard R. Duncan says "some twenty thousand men and thirty-six pieces of artillery". Author Gary C. Walker writes that the most detailed estimate of Hunter's force indicated 19,680 total troops with 16,643 of them available for duty.) Its infantry was organized into five brigades, two of which were grouped into the 1st Infantry Division commanded by Brigadier General Jeremiah C. Sullivan. The remaining three made up the 2nd Infantry Division, under Brigadier General George Crook. Two brigades of cavalry comprised the 1st Cavalry Division, which was commanded by Brigadier General Alfred N. Duffié. Three cavalry brigades formed the 2nd Cavalry Division that was commanded by Brigadier General William W. Averell.

Some of the Union regiments under Hunter's command were equipped with seven-shot Spencer repeating rifles (or carbines), including the 14th Pennsylvania Cavalry Regiment and the 1st West Virginia Cavalry Regiment. In addition to their carbines, cavalry regiments such as the 14th Pennsylvania were also equipped with revolvers and sabers. Captain James R. McMullin led two artillery batteries that were part of the 2nd Infantry Division. One section of a battery rode with the 1st Cavalry Division. Captain Henry A. du Pont led the largest portion of artillery, which served wherever needed.

Hunter's division commanders
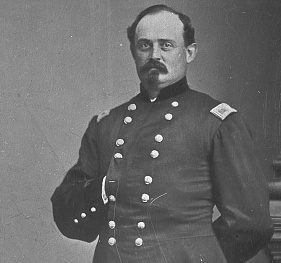
BG J.C. Sullivan, 1st Infantry

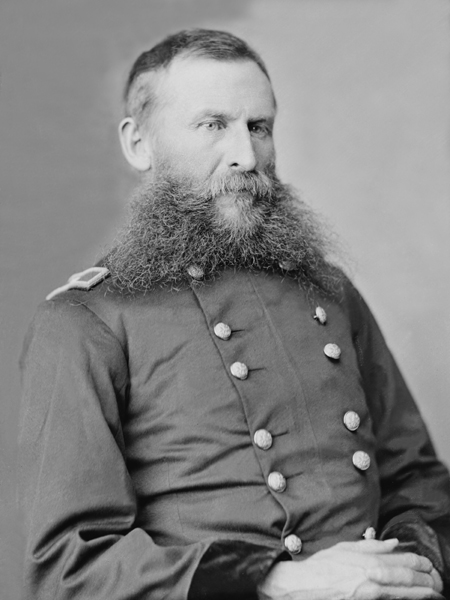
BG G. Crook, 2nd Infantry

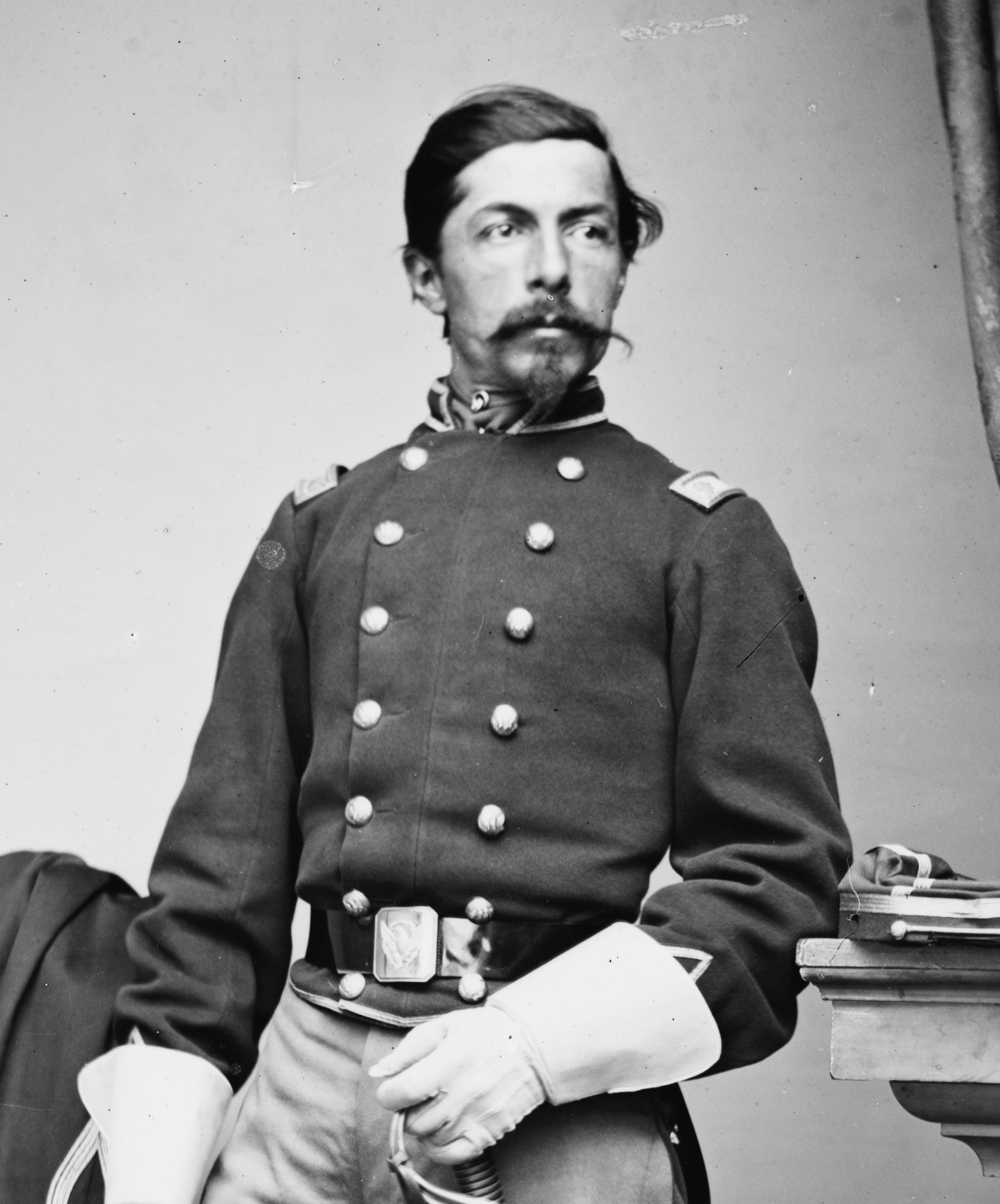
BG A.N. Duffié, 1st Cavalry

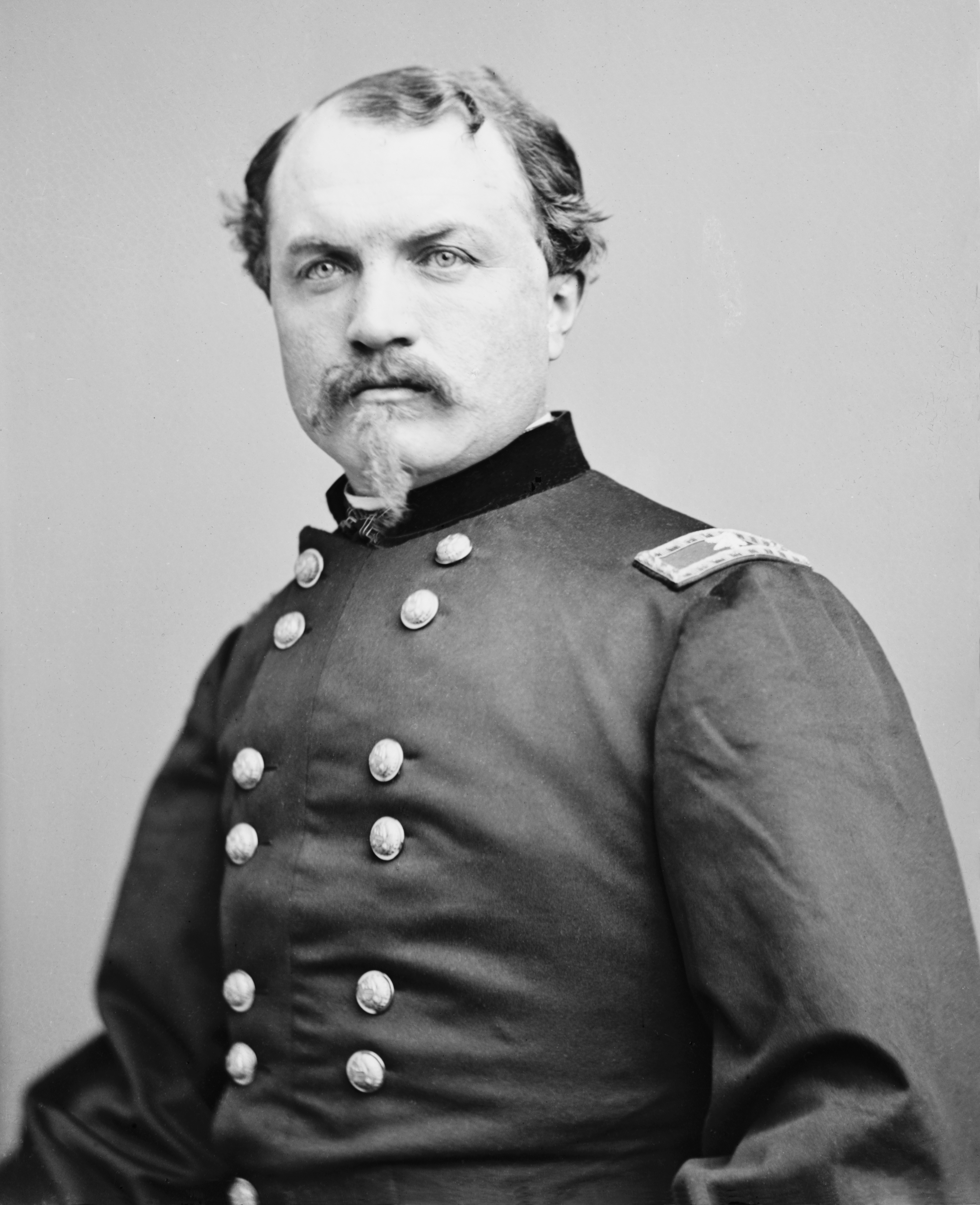
BG W.W. Averell, 2nd Cavalry

=== Confederate ===
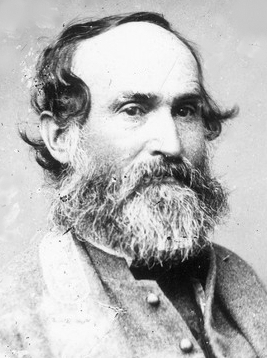
MG Jubal Early

The size of the Confederate force is unclear; at least two sources list the force as about 14,000 fighters. Author Gary C. Walker believes the Confederate force may have been as high as 15,623, which excludes a portion of Major General Jubal Early's Second Corps that did not arrive in time for the battle. The city's defenders initially consisted of a small force of hospital patients, home guard (soldiers either too old or two young for regular service), and cadets from the Virginia Military Institute (VMI), all commanded by Brigadier General Francis T. Nicholls. They eventually would have as many as 50 artillery pieces.

Major General John C. Breckinridge arrived in Lynchburg on June 15 and took command. On the next day, his division arrived. The division was commanded by Brigadier General Gabriel C. Wharton, and consisted of infantry brigades commanded by Colonel Augustus Forsberg and Colonel George S. Patton Sr.. Backing the infantry was King's Artillery Battalion. Breckinridge was bedridden because of injuries suffered in an earlier battle, and gave visiting Major General D. H. Hill unofficial command of Lynchburg. Hill placed troops and artillery around the city. He was assisted by Brigadier General Harry T. Hays, who was in town recovering from wounds received in battle. Breckenridge's cavalry was commanded by Brigadier General Imboden during the battle.

Understanding that he was outnumbered by the Union force approaching the city, Breckinridge requested more assistance from Richmond. Major General Jubal Early was sent to Lynchburg with his Second Corps, Army of Northern Virginia. Early and a portion of his command (a division commanded by Major General Stephen Dodson Ramseur) arrived by train in Lynchburg on June 17 around 1:00 pm. After conferring with Breckenridge, Early agreed to take command of Lynchburg and modified Hill's troop placements. Between 3:00 pm and 4:00 pm on June 18, a train arrived with Major General Arnold Elzey and Major General Robert Ransom. Elzey replaced Hill in official command of Lynchburg, but participated only in the pursuit after the battle. Ransom took command of the cavalry and participated in the pursuit after the battle, but only conducted a reconnoitering mission until the next day's pursuit. A portion of Brigadier General John B. Gordon's Division from Early's Second Corps arrived partway through the battle.

Confederate Leaders
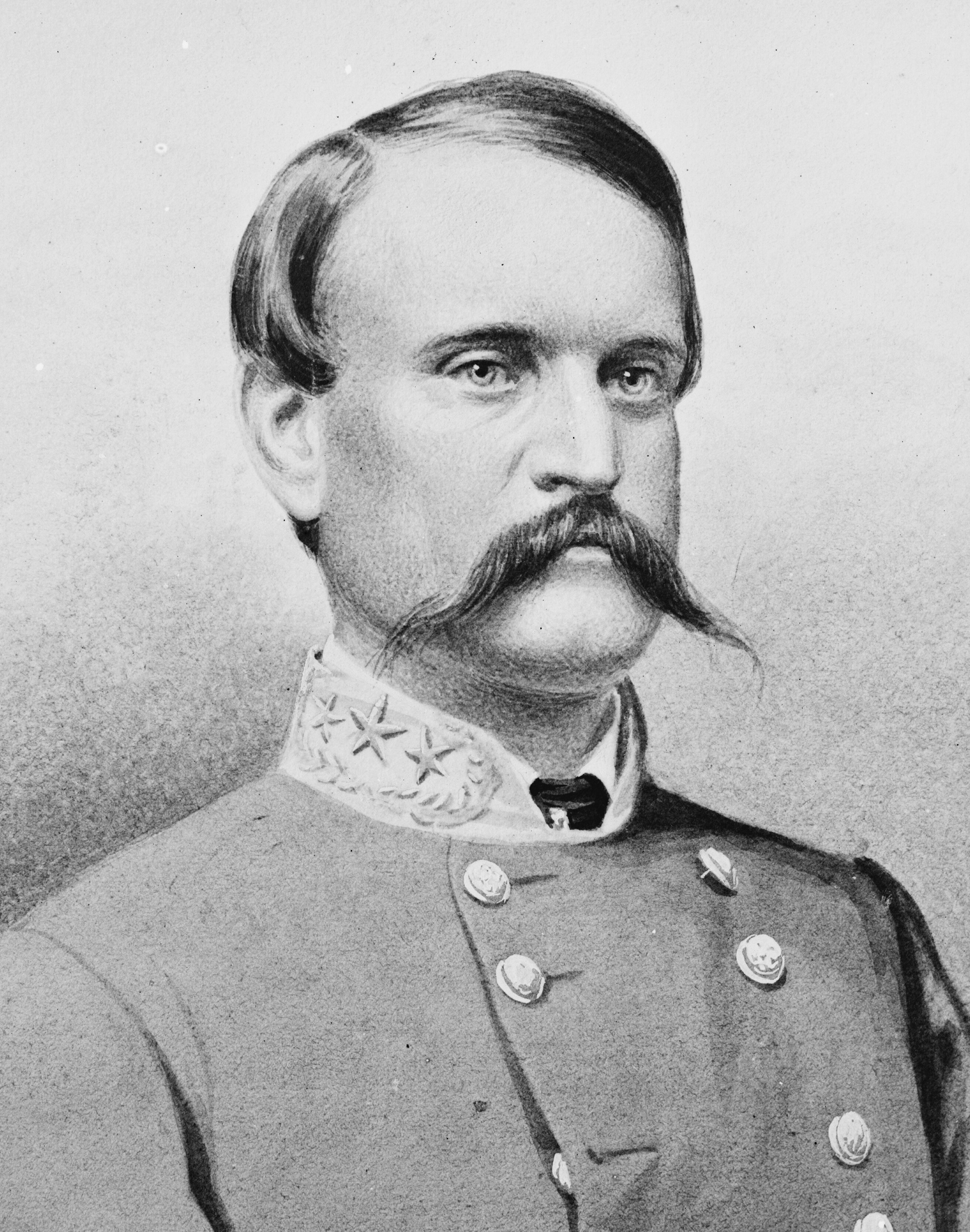
MG J.C. Breckinridge

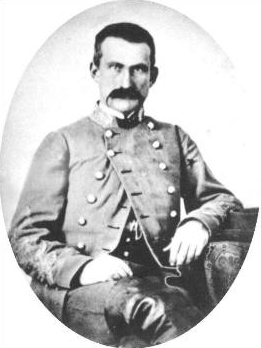
BG J. McCausland, Cavalry

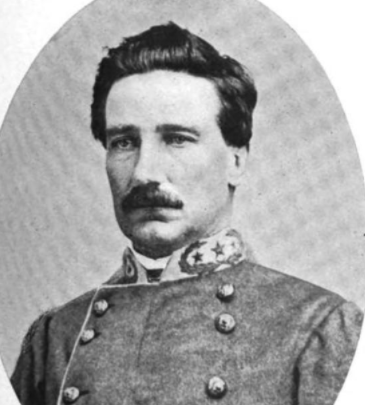
BG J.D. Imboden, Cavalry

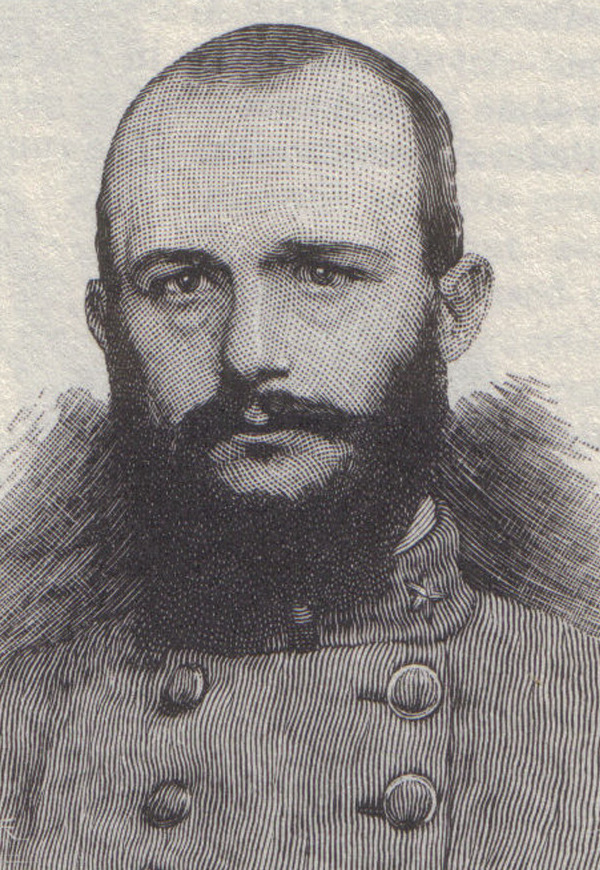
MG S.D. Ramseur, Infantry

== Disposition of forces and movement to battle ==
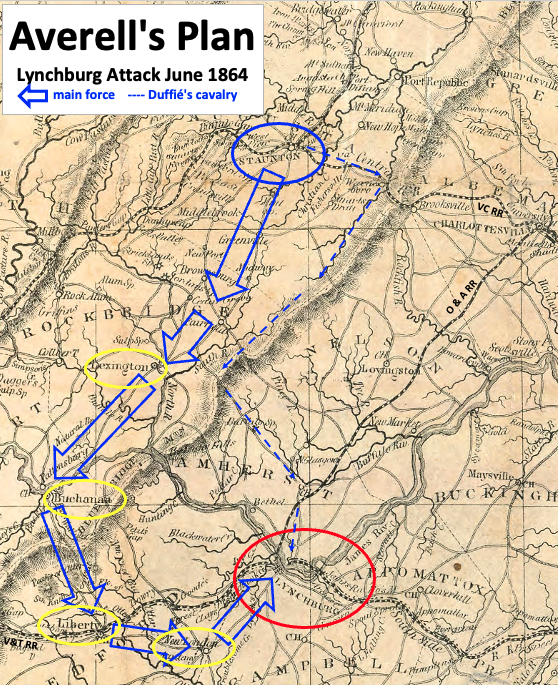
Plan for Hunter's Raid on Lynchburg

Initially, leaders such as Grant, Lee, and Breckinridge believed that Lynchburg should/would be attacked by a movement from Staunton to Charlottesville and then southwest. Hunter and his staff believed Major General Philip Sheridan would lead his troops on a mission to Charlottesville before proceeding to Lynchburg.

On June 8 Averell met with Hunter to propose a plan of attack, and Hunter approved the plan. Hunter's main force would make a movement further up the Shenandoah Valley (southwest) to Buchanan, while Duffié's 1st Cavalry Division would move east toward Rockfish Gap as if it was going to Charlottesville. Instead of moving through Rockfish Gap, Duffié would move southwest along the west side of the Allegheny Mountains to threaten any enemy units posted at mountain gaps. He would also make raids on the Orange & Alexandria Railroad that entered Lynchburg from the north. The main force would cross the mountains from Buchanan through the Peaks of Otter and then proceed east to Lynchburg (attacking from the west). Duffié would eventually cross the mountains at White's Gap and attack Lynchburg from the north after destroying some railroad line—all before forming a junction with Hunter's main force.

Crook had reservations about the plan. He believed Lynchburg needed to be attacked as soon as possible, and offered to conduct the attack solely with his infantry division. Confederate cavalry was the main obstacle between Staunton and Lynchburg, and some reports believed that more cavalry was arriving—and Breckinridge was returning to western Virginia from Richmond. Crook's offer was rejected, and Hunter believed some delays for supplies were unavoidable. The Union army waited until June 10.

=== Hunter departs from Staunton ===
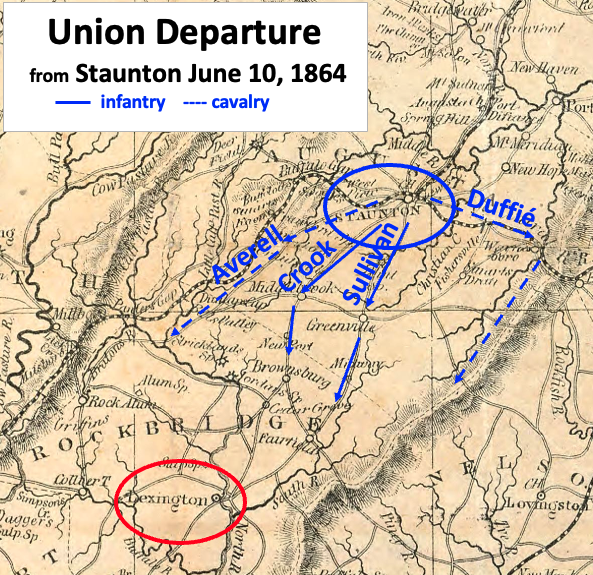
Hunter's departure from Staunton

On June 10, shortly after midnight, Duffié's cavalry moved east from Staunton for its feint toward Charlottesville. Encountering little resistance at the mountains, he began moving southwest and camped for the night not far from Nelson County's Tye River Gap. Hunter was still waiting to be resupplied in Staunton, but chose to depart with the main force around 11:00 AM. He rode with Sullivan's infantry on the road to Greensville, while Crook took the road to Brownsburg (Valley Pike) and Averell's cavalry took a road west of Crook.

Crook's troops skirmished with McCausland's cavalry shortly after the departure from Staunton. McCausland knew that he could not stop Hunter by himself—but any delay of the Union Army would give more time for reinforcements to arrive in Lynchburg. Tactics used by McCausland included barricades across the road and ambushes. That evening, Crook's infantry camped near Brownsburg, while McCausland met with the superintendent of the Virginia Military Institute, Colonel Francis Henney Smith, to develop a plan for defending Lexington.

=== Lexington ===
Skirmishing near Lexington, mostly with artillery, began on the morning of June 11. By 4:00 PM, Hunter's victorious troops marched down Lexington's Main Street. The next several days were spent foraging for food and burning buildings—instead of advancing to Lynchburg. Among buildings burnt were the Virginia Military Institute and the home of former Virginia governor John Letcher. (Note: Over 20 Confederate generals were alumni, or faculty, from Lexington's Virginia Military Institute (VMI). The list includes John Echols, Stonewall Jackson, John McCausland, and Gabriel C. Wharton. Some of the Union soldiers, such as Brigadier General Crook, were opposed to the burning of VMI.) Hunter blamed some of the delay on a wagon train of supplies that was late, and lack of communication from Duffié (who was following his mission). Hunter sent a courier with orders for Duffié to abandon his planned route and join the main force at Lexington. On the morning of June 13, Hunter sent most of Averell's division on to Buchanan. Two hundred of Averell's men, under the command of Captain Ashbel F. Duncan of the 14th Pennsylvania Cavalry, were sent on a different mission that involved circling Lynchburg and cutting communications. Duffié arrived in Lexington on the afternoon of June 13. Hunter's troops left Lexington on June 14.

While Hunter was in Lexington, Lynchburg city commander Brigadier General Francis T. Nicholls grew concerned about the Union presence (Duffié) on his north side, and telegraphed Confederate leadership in Richmond to request reinforcements. Further north on June 12, Union Major General Sheridan was defeated in the Battle of Trevilian Station and moved toward Grant instead of Lynchburg. (Note: Using today's (2026) highways, Trevilian Battlefield Trails and Park is 31.3 miles (50.4 km) from Charlottesville.) Breckinridge, at Rockfish Gap, sent orders to Imboden to move his cavalry toward Lynchburg. On June 13, Confederate General Robert E. Lee ordered Lieutenant General Jubal Early to move his corps of 8,000 soldiers to the Shenandoah Valley.

=== Buchanan ===
McCausland and a captain set the North River bridge on fire as Averell's cavalry approached. McCausland escaped by jumping into the river and crossing under the burning bridge, while the captain was captured. It is likely that McCausland was shot at by Union soldiers who did not know who he was.

Averell was harassed by McCausland during the June 13 movement to Buchanan, a distance of 24 miles (39 km). The fight for the town was brief, as Averell used artillery fire on the town for less than 40 minutes. McCausland's men retreated and the town was secured by Averell. Hunter's infantry moved into the town on June 14. Three iron works near Buchanan were destroyed by Averell's men on June 14. On the morning of June 15, Crook's infantry left Buchanan and led the way through the Peaks of Otter in the Blue Ridge Mountains. By evening, the Union force waited at the southern foot of the mountains, about seven miles (11 km) from the county seat then known as Liberty. Averell and Duffié's cavalry were sent out to scout for the enemy.

While Hunter was at Buchanan, Breckinridge received a telegram at Rockfish Gap that let him know that Early was on his way and Sheridan had been driven back. With this news, Breckinridge decided to relocate to Lynchburg. He arrived on June 15 without his brigades and took command of the city. Breckinridge was exhausted, and his injuries from a previous battle had not healed. His friend Major General D.H. Hill was in town, and Breckinridge asked him to set up a defensive perimeter. Elsewhere, Early and his troopers advanced as far as Trevilian Station on June 15, and planned to be at Charlottesville by sunset. Breckinridge sent every available piece of rolling stock to Charlottesville to help move Early's soldiers.

=== Liberty and Lynchburg ===
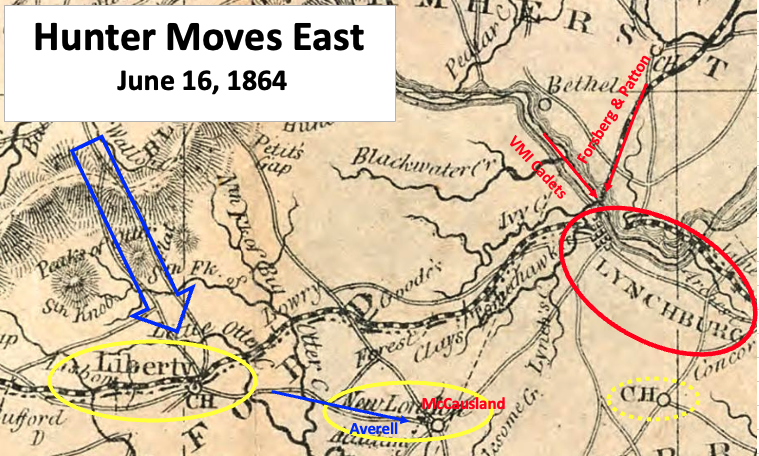
As Hunter moved toward Lynchburg, Confederate reinforcements began arriving

On June 15, Averell sent the brigade commanded by Colonel William H. Powell ahead to Liberty. On the same day, Averell's cavalry detachment of 200 riders rejoined the Union force at Liberty. They were able to damage railroad line and equipment on the Orange & Alexandria and South Side railroads. Hunter's main force entered the town on the next day. Hunter spent the day burning buildings, and had Crook's infantry destroy railroad infrastructure by twisting rail, burning ties, and burning the Liberty rail depot. Crook and his men were unhappy about the delay in movement to Lynchburg.

While Hunter's infantry was at Liberty, Averell moved toward Lynchburg. Near the end of the day (June 16), he attacked McCausland in a short action at New London. Although McCausland had been reinforced by Imboden, the Confederates moved back toward Lynchburg. (Note: Although Averell's report simply says McCausland "relinquished his position after a short action", Crook had sent some infantry to the Confederate right, and Confederate leadership withdrew because it was wary of being flanked.) By the evening of June 16, Hunter was believed to be somewhere west of the Big Otter River (between Liberty and New London), waiting for reports from Averell and Crook.

While Hunter was near Liberty, Virginia Military Institute cadets arrived (8:00 am on June 16) to reinforce Lynchburg. They had moved via the James River and Kanawha Canal, and brought six pieces of artillery. Troops from Breckinridge's Division also arrived in Lynchburg on June 16. On the evening of June 16, Early arrived in Charlottesville. He learned that Hunter was about 20 miles (32 km) west of Lynchburg, which caused him (Early) to begin a move to Lynchburg instead of the valley. He also learned that much of the damage inflicted on the Orange and Alexandria Railroad had been repaired.

== Battle, June 17 ==
Because of the news that Averell was skirmishing at New London, Hunter decided shortly after 2:00 am on June 17 to join Averell near the front. He began moving there with his staff, while one of his aides was sent to Brigadier General Sullivan to get his infantry division moving. The aide could not find Sullivan, causing a two-hour delay. Hunter also sent an order to Crook, who was camping with most of his division near the Forest Road and Big Otter River. The order was for Crook to move south toward New London, and flank the Confederates facing Averell.

=== Quaker Meetinghouse ===
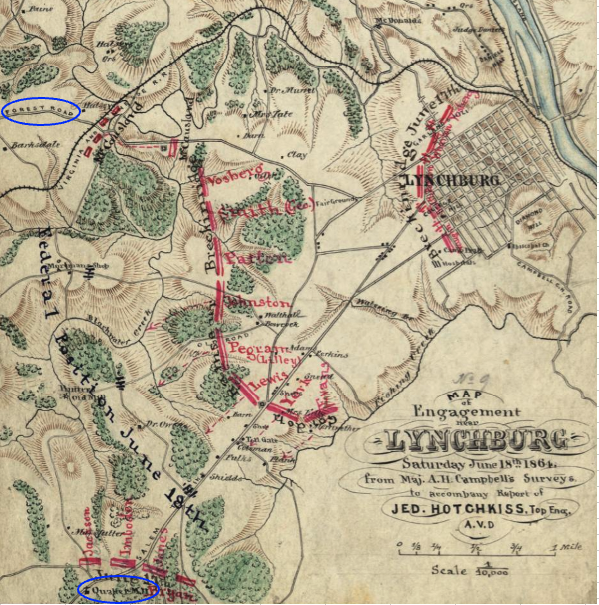
Quaker Meetinghouse (circled) was southwest of Lynchburg and south of Forest Road (circled)

Jubal Early and one of his divisions (commanded by Ramseur) arrived in Lynchburg during the early afternoon on June 17. After meeting the bed–ridden Breckinridge, Early agreed to take overall command and have Major General D.H. Hill command Breckinridge's troops. Estimated to be sometime after 1:30 pm, Early then rode with Hill to inspect the defensive perimeter.

Hill's defensive perimeter was along the city border and designed to be manned by a small force. Early was concerned that enemy artillery fire from positions just outside the original perimeter could land in the city, so he established a second perimeter further away. At that time, Imboden was skirmishing with Averell near the Quaker Meetinghouse.

At dawn on June 17, Averell moved toward Lynchburg. His report says he used the "old road", which was "some two miles to the right of Crook" (3.2 km). About eight miles (13 km) from Lynchburg, Averell met enemy skirmishers. Once he advanced to within sight of a Quaker Meetinghouse (a.k.a. "the stone church"), about four miles (6.4 km) from Lynchburg, the fighting became more serious. Waiting for Averell near the old stone church were three Confederate cavalry brigades, with artillery, under the command of Imboden. (Note: The three Confederate cavalry brigades near the Quaker Meetinghouse were Imboden's own brigade, and brigades commanded by John C. Vaughn and William L. "Mudwall" Jackson. Vaughn commanded mounted infantry and the remnants of Jones' cavalry. The artillery was Bryan's Battery.)

Crook reached the main road to Lynchburg by 10:00 am, and waited for Sullivan. Elsewhere, Duffié and his cavalry division moved to the Forest Road ("Forestville Road" in his report) to approach Lynchburg further north from Averell. A portion of Duffié's riders were sent to Balcony Falls (between Lexington and Lynchburg) because of a rumor that Breckenridge was there. Although Averell and Crook could have been ready to attack around noon, Hunter ordered them to wait for the rest of the army to arrive.

Crook did not resume his march to Lynchburg until 4:00 pm, when Sullivan caught up with him. The Union attack did not occur until after 4:00 pm—which helped the Confederate forces because it enabled Early to arrive with one division. This also allowed more preparation of entrenchments by the dismounted Confederate cavalry. Imboden's soldiers were positioned behind cover, and Averell would have to move across a clear field to attack them. The attack broke a general rule that cavalry should not "attack an entrenched enemy that has artillery support".

==== Averell and Crook attack ====
At first, Imboden's force repelled Averell's attackers. However, Averell had sent Crook a request for support, and Crook quickly responded with his three infantry brigades. Two of the brigades, commanded by Colonel Carr B. White and Colonel Rutherford B. Hayes, moved to the skirmish line and stopped the Confederates. The other brigade, commanded by Colonel Jacob M. Campbell, moved to the left and cleared the woods. Fighting for Campbell's brigade involved clubbed muskets and bayonets. Eventually the woods caught on fire and Imboden's force began being driven back toward fortifications around Lynchburg.

By that time Early was in position to observe the fighting. Seeing the danger, he summoned his infantry. Major General Stephen Dodson Ramseur's infantry division was repositioned to the Salem Pike at a redoubt between the Quaker Meetinghouse and the city. A portion of Gordon's infantry division also arrived. Eventually the fighting became a stalemated artillery duel. Ramseur's division was positioned on the Confederate right, while Gordon's fighters were on the left. On the Union side, Hayes' 1st brigade waited at the front line until 8:00 pm hoping to receive an order to continue the attack. Crook and Averell were in favor of a night attack, as was one of Averell's brigade commanders (Powell). Hunter and his staff preferred to continue the attack in the morning, so they established their headquarters for the evening at the nearby home (known as Sandusky House) of an acquaintance of Hunter.

=== Forest Road first day ===
While three of Hunter's divisions approached Lynchburg along the Salem Road, Duffié's cavalry approached Lynchburg further north on the Forest Road. During the early afternoon, Imboden sent McCausland's cavalry to defend the road with a section of artillery. The road was narrow and heavily wooded on both sides, making it difficult for effective use of cavalry. McCausland positioned his force, which included some infantry, and met the dismounted Union cavalry in a wooded area by 1:30 pm. Skirmishing lasted for about two hours as the Confederates fell back a short distance. As fighting erupted further south around the Quaker Meetinghouse (Averell and Imboden), McCausland's force fell back to about five miles (8.0 km) from the city. Sometime during the day, McCausland was joined by Jackson's cavalry. Duffié rested his division for the night at Clay's Mill. This position was (at the time) about five miles (8.0 km) from Lynchburg, and near Blackwater Creek and the Virginia & Tennessee Railroad.

=== First evening ===
The Train Deception

At least one historian has questioned that an intentional train deception was used by Early, and believes that the train ruse was an embellishment or fabrication typical of the Lost Cause Myth of the Confederacy. No ruse was mentioned by Early in his June 19 report or his post-war memoirs, and no trickery was mentioned by newspapers in Lynchburg and Richmond that reported shortly after the battle.

That evening, Hunter rested comfortably at Sandusky House and planned a morning attack. Early was without his corps' artillery and wagons, and he only had a portion of his entire force in place at Lynchburg. He had his soldiers put up more earthworks to strengthen his lines. Early may have also began a series of deceptions that led Hunter to believe more Confederate reinforcements were arriving in Lynchburg. He had the 51st Virginia Infantry Regiment march and counter-march all night, and he had a yard locomotive continuously run in and out of the city on the South Side Railroad line. Noise and the beating of drums were welcome, as was cheering. The noise from the trains convinced Union soldiers that Confederate reinforcements were arriving. Hunter's report says "During the night the trains on the different railroads were heard running without intermission, while repeated cheers and the beating of drums indicated the arrival of large bodies of troops...."

== Battle, June 18 ==
=== Morning situation ===
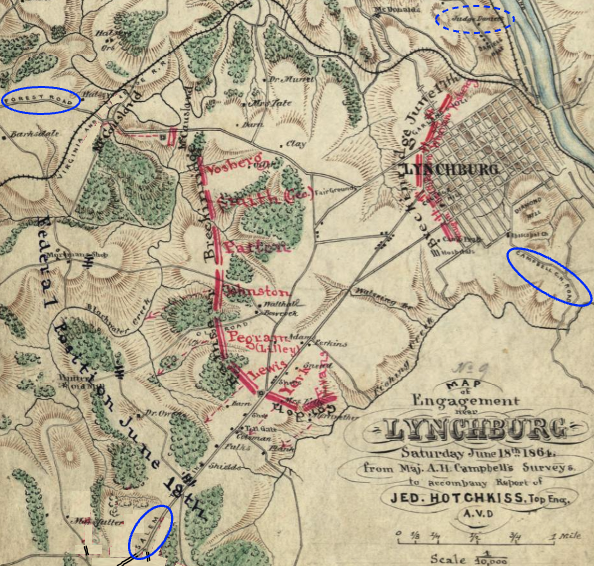
June 18 situation with Union assault roads circled. Judge Daniel's farm, north near the river, is circled with a broken-dash.

Shortly after 2:00 am, Early had Breckinridge's brigades (including Forsberg and Patton) move west from the inner circle to the northern part of the outer line, connecting with Early's line that was next to the Salem Pike. By now, Hunter's army was low on ammunition and supplies, and deep in enemy territory. The various delays between Staunton and Lynchburg had diminished his advantage in troops because it allowed time for Confederate reinforcements to arrive. The main Union battle line on the west side of Lynchburg began roughly three miles (4.8 km) south of the Forest Road and stretched south to slightly across the Salem Pike. The terrain of woods and hills gave an advantage to the Confederate defenders.

Noticing that the Confederates had strengthened their fortifications, Hunter searched for weak points that he could exploit. He also sent Colonel Powell's cavalry brigade (from Averell's division) to the extreme Union right, which involved moving east in Campbell County and going through Campbell Court House. From there, Powell could move north to the south side of Lynchburg using the Campbell Court House Road. Added to Powell's brigade was a brigade of infantry and two artillery pieces. Hunter hoped to have Lynchburg approached from three points: Duffié on Forest Road, the main force on the Salem Pike, and Powell on Campbell Court House Road. (Note: A different source says that Averell sent Powell south to cut the Southside Railroad. Contradicting that source, a soldier from one of Powell's brigades wrote that the mission was "either to attack the rebel right or endeavor to capture and burn Lynchburg", and did not mention a railroad.)

=== Powell at Campbell Court House Road ===
Powell's force began its mission during the night—either late on June 17 or early on June 18. Powell was aware that Union messengers were getting lost in the dark in unfamiliar territory, so he used a local for his guide. After wandering through the hills in the dark for hours, Powell realized that his guide was probably leading the Union force to nowhere. The guide was executed and Powell continued on his mission. Powell's force threatened Campbell Court House, and drove back some of Imboden's cavalry. Powell's cavalry got close enough to Lynchburg that it could see the town's church spires in the distance.

=== Duffié at Forest Road ===
The terrain between Forest Road and the Salem Pike made it difficult for couriers to communicate with Duffié, and he received no orders during the early morning. He began advancing along Forest Road, on his own initiative, in the morning. Around 9:00 am he encountered McCausland's skirmishers, and near the railroad bridge over Ivy Creek the resistance became more challenging. Duffié attacked and drove McCausland back from the bridge before it could be completely destroyed. At 10:30 am a courier from Averell brought an order to attack, and promised assistance. Duffié renewed his attack, and drove the Confederates back to a point near Backwater Creek about two miles (3.2 km) from the city. From there, a previously hidden infantry force stopped the Union advance. Duffié could also see dust in the air that convinced him that his left flank was in danger, and then it appeared his right flank was also in a precarious position. Near 5:00 pm, a Confederate assault aided by artillery pushed Duffié back across Backwater Creek.

Despite having driven the Confederates back twice, Duffié believed he was outnumbered. Part of this belief was from observations of Confederate troop movements that caused him to believe fresh troops from the division of Confederate Major General Robert E. Rodes had arrived. Confederate Brigadier General Wharton had marched, and counter-marched, his troops—a deception that made his force appear larger than it was. Duffié's messages to Hunter expressing his fear of a Confederate force that was increasing in size may have added to Hunter's fears. Historian Charles Minor Blackford believed that an approach to Lynchburg from the north by any Union force, through Judge Daniel's Rivermont farm that was east of Duffié's position, would have been fairly easy since Early did not have the resources to protect that side of the town.

=== Main Union force at Salem Pike ===
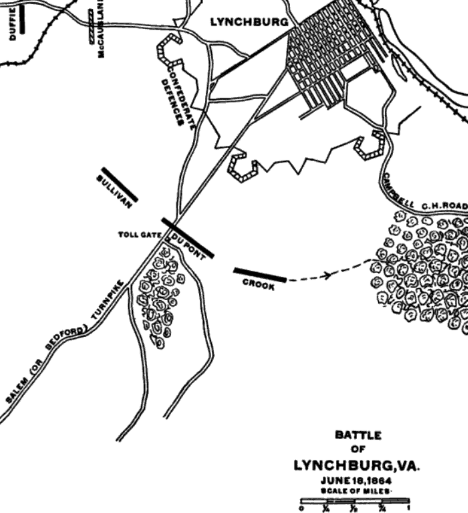
Hunter placed his infantry and artillery across the Salem Pike

The action near the Salem Pike began more slowly than it did at Forest Road. More of Early's troops had arrived during hours before dawn, but some were still en route. Early expected a Union attack after dawn, and began making use of his artillery on Union positions around sunrise.

Hunter advanced his skirmishers cautiously on the Salem Pike, followed by the two infantry divisions with artillery. Averell's cavalry was held in reserve. Sullivan's infantry was on the Union left, Du Pont's artillery was in the center across the pike, and Crook's infantry was on the right. A portion of Averell's cavalry covered the extreme right flank. Hoping to flank the Confederate left, Crook's division was moved further to the Union right. Sullivan, and one of his division commanders, became concerned about the growing Confederate presence in their front.

==== Early attacks ====
Around 1:00 pm Early decided to push forward against the cautious Union soldiers. He began with an artillery assault on the middle of the Union line. Then Ramseur's division and Gordon's partial division attacked. This drove the Union skirmishers back upon Sullivan's infantry, causing a Union retreat until the brigade of Colonel George D. Wells ambushed the advancing Confederates from a hill top.

Although the Union retreat had ended, the Confederate attacks continued. Hunter responded by ordering Crook to return from his flanking maneuver, which Crook did promptly. The two Union infantry divisions (Crook and Sullivan) then drove Early's soldiers back to their fortifications. (Note: Captain Henry A. du Pont believed that if the Confederate attack had occurred after Crook had moved further into the woods in his flanking maneuver, Sullivan might have been defeated before Crook could return to provide assistance.) Although Early's assault failed to defeat Hunter's army, it succeeded in a different way. Confederate prisoners interrogated by Hunter's staff confirmed that Early's Second Corps had arrived in Lynchburg—including Early himself. The arrival of trains and the cheering of local citizens could be heard in the late afternoon, and this added credibility to the Confederate prisoners' claims. Fearing a Confederate force larger than his army, and being low on supplies, Hunter ordered his wagon trains to withdraw westward toward Buford Gap.

Worried that any failure on his part could jeopardize his own command and Lee's army too, Early made no more major attacks that evening. He preferred to wait until his entire army arrived in Lynchburg, and needed to rest his exhausted soldiers. Major Generals Elzey and Ransom had arrived from Richmond, and needed to be briefed. Elzey would assume command of Breckinridge's infantry, and Ransom would supersede Imboden as commander of the cavalry. Early planned to attack at daybreak (June 19).

== Retreat ==
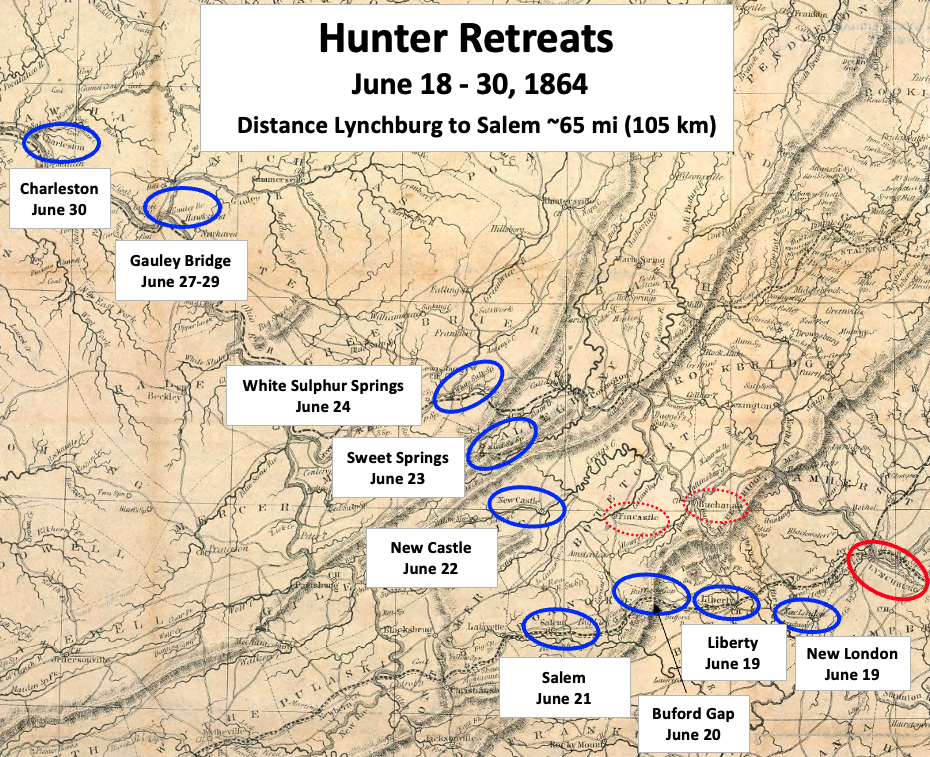
Hunter retreated west and was chased by Confederate forces

Hunter made the decision to retreat during dinnertime (June 18). He sent pickets closer to the Confederate lines, while the remaining troops quietly withdrew. No campfires were allowed. The pickets pressed the Confederate lines until midnight. Further north, Duffié received an order from Averell around 7:00 pm to advance, and then shortly later received another dispatch that said the army was going to retreat. No other instructions came. Duffié waited until 10:00 pm for more instructions. Without orders, he decided to withdraw west on Forest Road. After moving three miles (4.8 km), he halted and sent a captain to contact Hunter. The captain reported back that the army was gone. Continuing his retreat all night, Duffié finally found Hunter's rear guard about four miles (6.4 km) from Liberty.

Southeast of the main force, Powell received a message early in the morning (June 19) that the army was in retreat. This surprised his officers, and they realized they were in danger of being cut off from the main force. They withdrew while keeping off the main road, and caught up with the fleeing Union army around daybreak (June 19) near New London. (Note: A different source says that around 6:30 pm on June 18, Powell received a message that Hunter had ordered a retreat. Powell was about 20 miles (32 km) away from the main Union force, and may have engaged in a small skirmish at Campbell Courthouse.) A northeasterly route of retreat down the Shenandoah Valley would take too long before Hunter could be resupplied, and it could enable Early to attack the Union Army's flank and rear. Hunter chose a safer route northwest toward West Virginia. Duffié's cavalry took the lead, while Averell's cavalry was the rear guard.

=== Early pursues ===
Shortly after midnight Early began to suspect that the Union Army might have retreated, but he was unsure if the retreat was actually a move to another side of Lynchburg. At daybreak (June 19), Hunter's absence was confirmed, and Early began a pursuit. Early's Corps moved west on the Salem Pike, while Elzey led Breckinridge's brigades along the Forest Road with Ransom's cavalry on the right. Because of the rush to get most of these troops to Lynchburg, they did not have their wagon trains with food and ammunition—and many officers did not have their horses. Early arrived at New London at 9:30 am, June 19. He hoped to have McCausland catch the Union troops at Liberty. Although Union scouts had entered Liberty around 8:00 am, it was not until past noon that the main force entered the town. McCausland, after taking the wrong road, did not get to Liberty until around sunset. There he skirmished with the Union rear guard, which was Averell's cavalry.

Major points along Hunter's retreat route were New London, Liberty, Buford's Gap (June 20), Salem (June 21), New Castle (June 22), Sweet Springs (June 23), White Sulphur Springs (June 24), Gauley Bridge (June 27–29), and Charleston (June 30). Early's original strategy was to block routes north to Buchanan and Fincastle. There were various skirmishes along the route of retreat, but the major threat to the Union Army ended after it crossed the mountains near Sweet Springs. Hunter's army was finally resupplied near Gauley Bridge.

== Aftermath ==
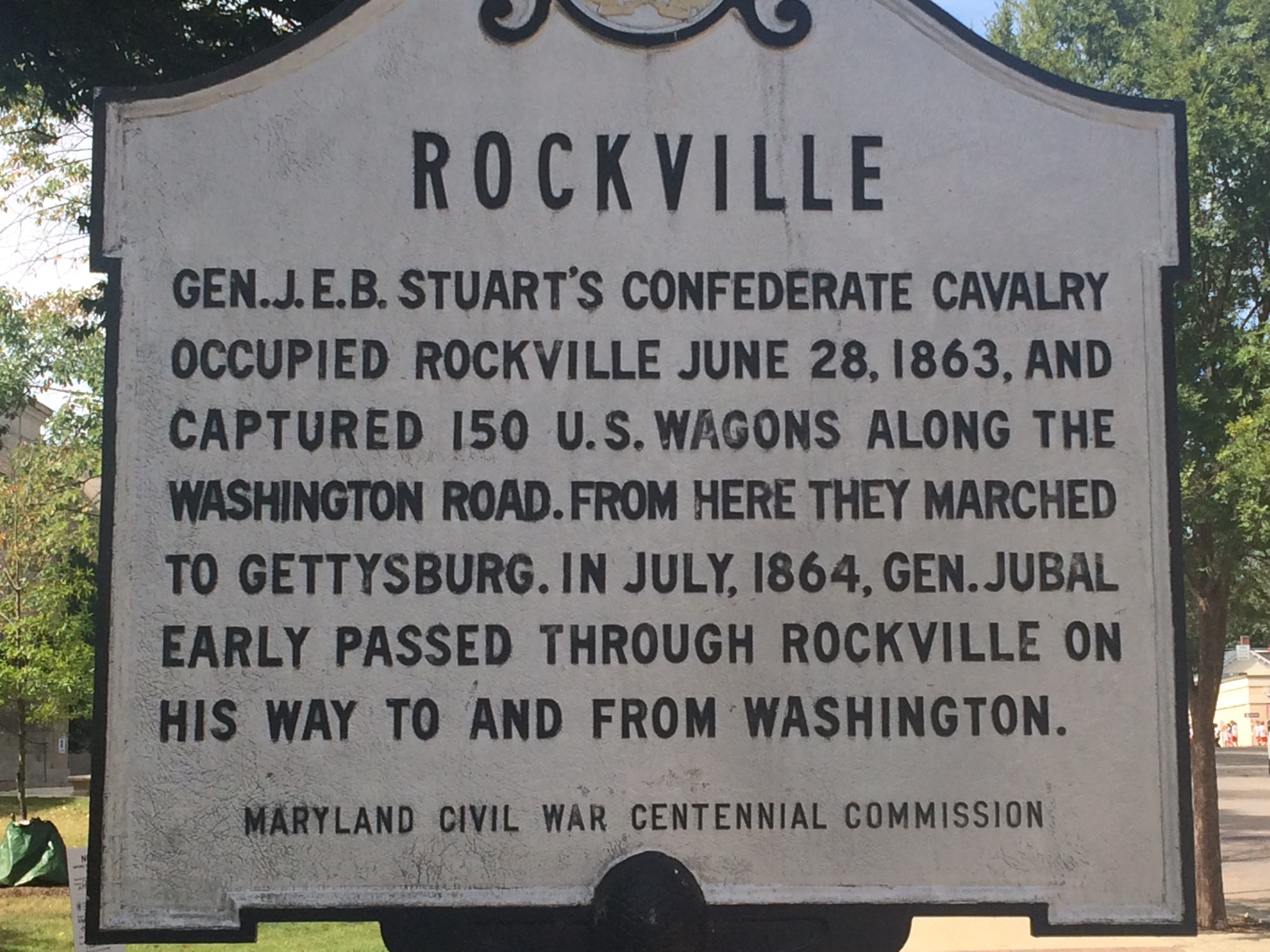
Early approached Washington

Crook's fear that Hunter's army would take too long to get to Lynchburg was fully justified. The long route, and various delays, enabled Confederate troops to arrive at Lynchburg in time to successfully defend the city. Hunter wasted too much time burning buildings, and tried to pass blame for his delays onto others. In his report, Hunter implied that his supply wagon train, Duffié, and Averell all caused delays. Years later in Jubal Early's autobiography, a long footnote said that "Hunter's delay in advancing from Staunton had been most remarkable" and that "an energetic advance would have brushed away McCausland's small force, and Lynchburg, with all its manufacturing establishments and stores, would have fallen before assistance arrived."

By retreating into West Virginia, Hunter left the Shenandoah Valley open to Early. On June 23, after a rest, Early began moving down the Valley toward the Potomac River. After a victory on July 9 in the Battle of Monocacy near Frederick, Maryland, Early moved toward Washington through Rockville. Beginning July 11 and roughly five miles from the White House, Early threatened the Washington for two days in the Battle of Fort Stevens until he retreated. (Note: Estimates of the distance from Fort Stevens to the White House vary, but they are typically under ten miles (16 km). At least two newspapers said "within five miles" (8 km). A National Park Service article says six miles (9.7 km). A city of Alexandria article says approximately seven miles (11 km). Breckenridge is said to have been able "to see the white dome of the Capitol".) After returning to the Shenandoah Valley, he sent cavalry to Pennsylvania where they burned the city of Chambersburg.

=== Casualties ===
Hunter left 117 seriously wounded soldiers at Hutter's barn on the Sandusky House property during the retreat. The Union report in the Official Record did not list casualties for only the Battle of Lynchburg. Instead, it listed casualties for June 10 through June 23. Total casualties were 103 killed, 564 wounded, and 271 captured or missing—a total of 938. Two sources, the U.S. National Park Service and the American Battlefield Trust, list estimated casualties for the battle as 700 for the Union force and 200 for the Confederacy.

=== Preservation ===
The remnants of a roughly square earthen fort built as part of Lynchburg's outer defense is now called Fort Early. A building inside the fort, constructed in 1922, is the Fort Hill Women's Club headquarters. The headquarters houses a museum with exhibits related to the battle. Located near what was called Salem Pike, the fort is now listed as near the intersection of Fort Avenue and Memorial Avenue. The Medal of Honor was awarded to Union Private John W. Mostoller, of the 54th Pennsylvania Infantry Regiment, for leading a charge that captured a Confederate battery. The site of Mostoller's action is now part of the University of Lynchburg and close to Hopwood Hall.
