= 54th Pennsylvania Infantry Regiment =

Union Army infantry regiment

54th Pennsylvania Volunteer Infantry
- Pennsylvania flag
- Active: August 1861 – July 15, 1865
- Country: United States
- Allegiance: Union
- Branch: Infantry
- Engagements: Battle of New Market; Battle of Piedmont; Battle of Lynchburg; Battle of Opequon; Battle of Fisher's Hill; Battle of Cedar Creek; Battle of Petersburg III; Battle of High Bridge; Appomattox Campaign

The 54th Pennsylvania Volunteer Infantry was an infantry regiment which served in the Union Army during the American Civil War. Organized in Camp Curtin on February 27, 1862, the regiment was initially sent to defend the Baltimore and Ohio Railroad against guerrilla bands before taking part in the Valley Campaigns of 1864, fighting from the Battle of New Market to the Battle of Cedar Creek. The 54th would later participate in Appomattox Campaign, participating the capture of Fort Greg and taking part in the Battle of High Bridge.

== History ==
=== Organization ===
The 54th was recruited during August and September 1861. The companies were from the following counties:

- Company A Indiana and Cambria Counties
- Company B Somerset County
- Company C Somerset County
- Company D Somerset County
- Company E Cambria County
- Company F Harrisburg
- Company G Somerset County
- Company H Northampton, Cambria, and Somerset Counties
- Company I Cambria County
- Company K Allentown, Lehigh County

=== Early service ===
Jacob M. Campbell was selected as colonel of the regiment, Barnabas McDermit as lieutenant colonel and John P. Linton as major. The companies were gathered together and organized at Camp Curtin in Harrisburg, Pennsylvania.On February 27, 1862, the regiment was ordered to Washington, D.C., and then sent to Harpers Ferry the following month. Once there, the companies were detached to various points along the Baltimore and Ohio Railroad to defend it against guerrilla bands. The companies were assigned as follows:

- Company A: South Band Bridge, under the command of Captain John P. Suter
- Company B: Paw Paw, under the command of Captain John H. Hite
- Company C: Great Cacapon Bridge, under the command of Captain E. D. Yutzy
- Company D: Alpine Station, under the command of Captain Thomas H. Lapsly
- Company E: Water Station Number 12 (later Magnolia, WV), under the command of Captain Patrick Graham
- Company F: Sleepy Creek Bridge, under the command of Captain G. W. Davis
- Company G: Back Creek Bridge, under the command of Captain F. B. Long
- Company H: Rockwell's Run, under the command of Captain John O. Billheimer
- Company I: Sir John's Run, under the command of Captain William B. Bonacker
- Company K: Little Cacapon Bridge, under the command of Captain Edmond R. Newhard

On October 4, 1862, a Confederate force led by Brig. Gen. John D. Imboden captured Companies B and K at the Paw Paw station (both of which were exchanged in December). The regiment was later assigned to the VIII Corps as part of the 3rd Brigade, Second Division, and sent to Romney, West Virginia.

In January 1863, the 54th was transferred to the Department of West Virginia as part of the 4th Brigade, First Division. Campbell was given command of the brigade. Linton, promoted to lieutenant colonel after the resignation of McDermit, took charge of the regiment. Captain Enoch D. Yutzy of company C was promoted to major.

=== 1864 Valley Campaigns ===
In May 1864, Maj. Gen. Franz Sigel was put in command of the department by Lt. Gen. Ulysses S. Grant and ordered to capture the Shenandoah Valley as part of Grant's spring offensive. On May 15, Sigel encountered Maj. Gen. John C. Breckinridge's Confederate force in the Battle of New Market. The 54th Pennsylvania fought near the center of the Union line and managed to retreat in good order. The regiment lost 174 men in the battle, including Linton, who was wounded.

On May 26, Maj. Gen. David Hunter took command of the department from Sigel and embarked on the Lynchburg Campaign. During this campaign, the 54th lost eighty-four men. At the Battle of Piedmont, Private Thomas Evans of Company D seized the colors of the 45th Virginia Infantry, for which he would receive the Medal of Honor. On June 8, 1864, the enlistments for most of the 3rd and 4th Pennsylvania Reserve Regiments expired. Those who were not mustered out were transferred to the 54th. On 18, June 1864 in action at Lynchburg, Virginia Private John William Mostoller voluntarily led a charge on a Confederate battery (the officers of his company being disabled) and compelled its hasty removal for which he would later be awarded a Medal of Honor.

After Hunter's withdrawal into West Virginia, Maj. Gen. Philip Sheridan was appointed commander of the Union forces (now called the Army of the Shenandoah) in the Valley.

Under Sheridan, the 54th fought on September 19 at Third Winchester (the Battle of Opequon), on September 21-22 at the Battle of Fisher's Hill during pursuit of Early's forces after Winchester, and on October 19 at the Battle of Cedar Creek.

=== Later service ===
In December, Sheridan's army was transferred to Petersburg, and the 54th was assigned to the Army of the James, in which the 54th served for the rest of the war. It participated in the capture of Fort Gregg during the breakout at Petersburg and in the Appomattox Campaign. At the Battle of High Bridge, the entire 54th Regiment was captured, but was released four days later. The regiment was sent first to Camp Parole at Annapolis, Maryland, and then to Harrisburg, where it was mustered out on July 15.

== Casualties ==
- Killed and mortally wounded: 5 officers, 108 enlisted men
- Died of disease: 2 officers, 137 enlisted men

== Citations and awarded regimental members ==
The regiment also had 3 Medal of Honor awardees:

- Private Thomas Evans, Co. D, Captured the flag of the 45th VA at the Battle of Piedmont, 5 June 1864
- Private John Mostoller, Co. B, Led a charge against a rebel battery of artillery at the Battle of Lynchburg, 18 June 1864
- Musician James Snedden, Co. E, Picked up a rifle and carried it through the Battle of Piedmont, 5 June 1864

== Reenactors ==
In 1992, a group of civil war enthusiasts started the 54th PVI Co. A, to portray the soldiers and civilians from their hometown of Johnstown, PA. Since then the unit has expanded well beyond the borders of Cambria county, consisting of members from all over Pennsylvania, West Virginia, and Maryland. The group participates in various events in Pennsylvania, Maryland, Virginia, West Virginia, and Ohio. Such events have included the 150th anniversary events of New Market, Cedar Creek, Gettysburg, Bull Run, Antietam, Chancellorsville, and Appomattox.

The regiment was also instrumental in helping fund a Civil War memorial statue in Johnstown. The monument was dedicated on November 11, 2000, in Johnstown's Central Park. The regiment belongs to the 2nd regiment Federal Volunteer Brigade.

== Popular culture ==
The regiment is highlighted during the Battle of New Market scenes in Sean McNamara's 2014 film Field of Lost Shoes. In the film, Capt. Henry DuPont of the 5th United States Artillery (played by David Arquette) praises the men of the 54th for holding their line, saying "God bless those Pennsylvania boys--holding fast!".

== See also ==
- List of Pennsylvania Civil War Units
