= Thomas Evans (Medal of Honor) =

- Born: c. 1824; Wales
- Died: 1866 (aged 41–42)
- Burial place: Bethel Cemetery Ebensburg, Pennsylvania, US
- Military career
- Allegiance: United States; Union
- Branch: Union Army, United States Volunteers
- Service years: 1864 - 1865
- Rank: Private
- Units: Company D, 54th Pennsylvania Infantry
- Awards: Medal of Honor

Thomas Evans (c. 1824–1866), was a soldier in the Union Army who received the United States military's highest award for valor, the Medal of Honor, for his actions during the American Civil War.

== Biography ==
Evans was born in Wales in 1824. He joined the Army from Johnstown, Cambria County, Pennsylvania in February 1864, and was mustered out in May 1865. On June 5, 1864, his unit engaged a Confederate force at Piedmont, Virginia where he and a fellow soldier, Pvt. James Snedden of Company E, both earned the Medal of Honor.

In his report, the 54th Pennsylvania's commander, Colonel J. M. Campbell wrote:

Lieut. R.P. Robison of Company B captured Colonel Browne, who commanded a Virginia brigade [sic]... Two colonels of regiments, with other field staff, and line officers, too numerous to mention were captured by different members of my regiment. Private Thomas Evans, of Company D, wrested the colors from a color bearer of a Tennessee regiment [sic], sending the color bearer to the rear. So numerous were the captures made of the enemy, that I was compelled to stop taking them to the rear, and simply disarm them and turn them out over the barricade to be taken charge of by the cavalry, who were in the open field on our right and rear.

He died in 1866 and is buried in Bethel Cemetery Ebensburg, Pennsylvania. His name, along with others from the area, was inscribed on a bronze plaque attached to a Civil War monument. The plaque is located in Veterans Square in the town of Piedmont.

== Medal of Honor citation ==
Rank and organization: Private, Company D, 54th Pennsylvania Infantry. Place and date: At Piedmont, Va., 5 June 1864. Entered service at: Johnstown, Cambria County, Pa. Birth: Wales. Date of issue: 26 November 1864.

Citation:

Capture of flag of 45th Virginia (C.S.A.).

== See also ==
- List of American Civil War Medal of Honor recipients: A–F
