= Piedmont, Augusta County, Virginia =

Unincorporated community in Virginia, United States

Piedmont, Virginia
- Unincorporated community
- Location within Virginia Location within the United States
- Coordinates: 38°12′50″N 78°53′57″W
- Country: United States
- State: Virginia
- County: Augusta
- Elevation: 1,227 ft (374 m)
- Time zone: UTC-5 (Eastern (EST))
  - Summer (DST): UTC-4 (EDT)
- ZIP code: 24437
- Area code: 540
- GNIS feature ID: 1495091

Piedmont is an unincorporated community in Augusta County, Virginia, United States. Piedmont is located 10.4 miles (16.7 km) northeast of Staunton and 10.1 miles (16.3 km) north-northwest of Waynesboro.

== History ==
During the American Civil War, the Battle of Piedmont between U.S. forces under Maj. Gen. David Hunter and Confederate forces under Brigadier General William E. Jones was fought on June 5, 1864 just north of Piedmont. During the battle, Jones was killed and Hunter's forces captured nearly 1,000 Confederate prisoners. The Confederate defeat near Piedmont allowed Hunter to easily occupy Staunton the next day, and threatened the Confederacy's security in the Shenandoah Valley as well as on other fronts, since it necessitated the need to detach Early's Second Corps from the main body of the Army of Northern Virginia near Petersburg, Virginia.
