= Sandusky House (Lynchburg, Virginia) =

Historic house in Virginia, United States

- Historic Sandusky
- U.S. National Register of Historic Places
- Virginia Landmarks Register
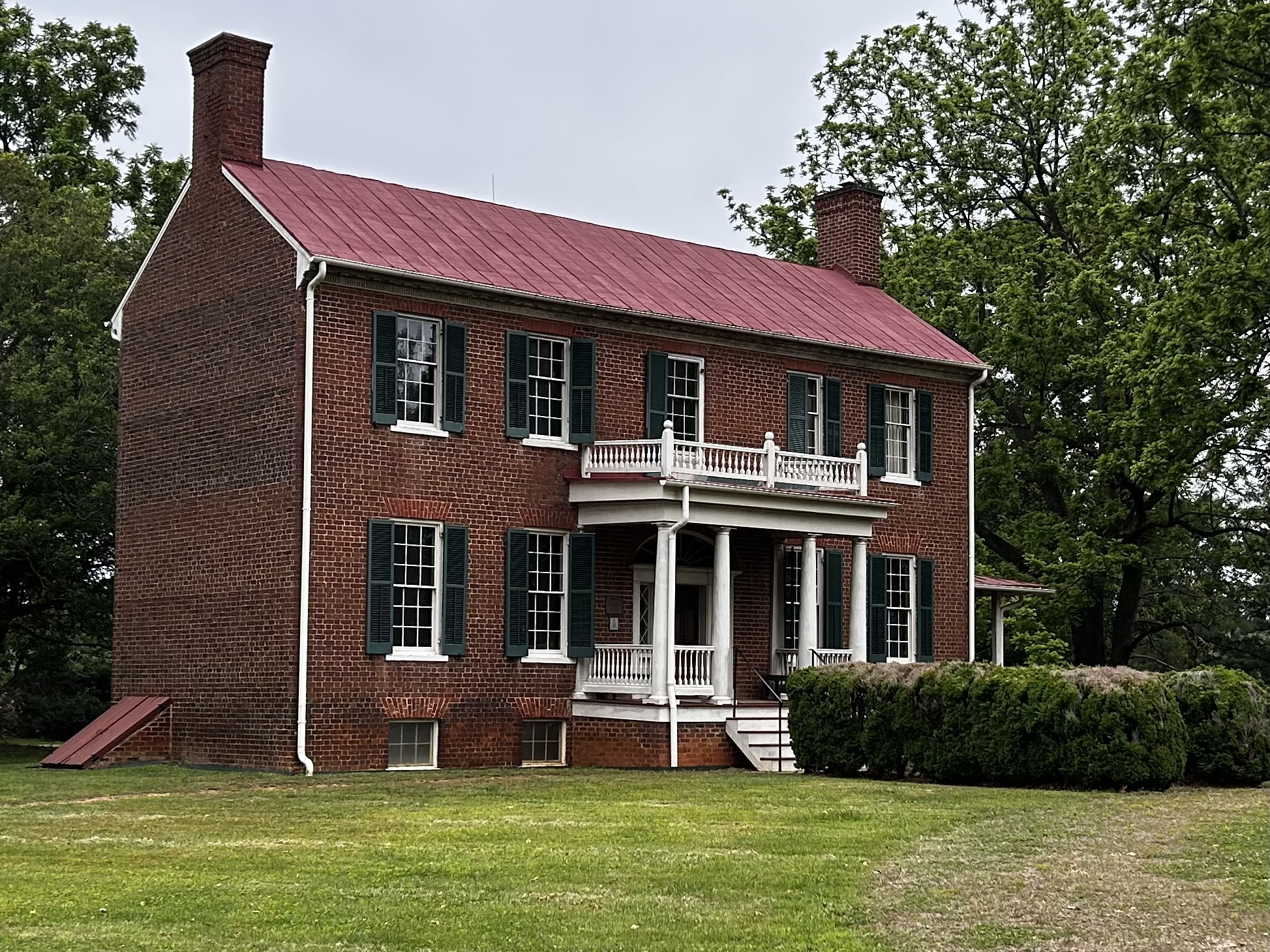
- Historic Sandusky, Lynchburg VA, May 2025

- Location within Virginia Location within the United States
- Location: 757 Sandusky Dr., Lynchburg, Virginia
- Coordinates: 37°22′48″N 79°11′49″W
- Area: 3.8 acres (1.5 ha)
- Built: 1808
- Architectural style: Federal
- NRHP reference No.: 82004571
- VLR No.: 118-0017

Significant dates
- Added to NRHP: July 26, 1982
- Designated VLR: February 16, 1982

Historic Sandusky is a historic home located in Lynchburg, Virginia. It is a formal two-story, brick "I" house built about 1808, with a later addition. It was built by Charles Johnston, and is one of the earliest homes in the Lynchburg area to display the architectural details and refinements characteristic of Federal design.

While Charles Johnston lived in the house he was visited by Thomas Jefferson of Poplar Forest who went to the home as a dinner guest December 1817. Jefferson and Johnston knew each other as neighbors and traded goods often.

The home was then sold to John Mathews Otey, whose family occupied the house from 1821 to 1841, before it changed hands to George C. Hutter, whose family owned the house for over 110 years.

In 1864, during the Battle of Lynchburg, Sandusky served as Union headquarters. Among those quartered at the home were Gen. David Hunter and future Presidents Rutherford B. Hayes and William McKinley, who served on Hunter's staff. During the occupation by the Union soldiers, the residents of the house, including retired Major Hutter and his family, were locked upstairs. Before retreating, General Hunter gave orders to his troops to ransack the house, and "Union soldiers plunged bayoneted rifles into the family portraits hanging on the walls..."

Other buildings on the property consist of two 20th-century tenant houses, one frame and one brick. It is currently owned and operated by the Historic Sandusky Foundation in partnership with the University of Lynchburg as a house museum related to the American Civil War and the Battle of Lynchburg. It is home to the Hurtt and Proffitt Cultural Resources Archaeology Materials Laboratory.

It was listed on the National Register of Historic Places in 1982. It was also listed on the Virginia Landmarks Register in the same year.

== Gallery ==
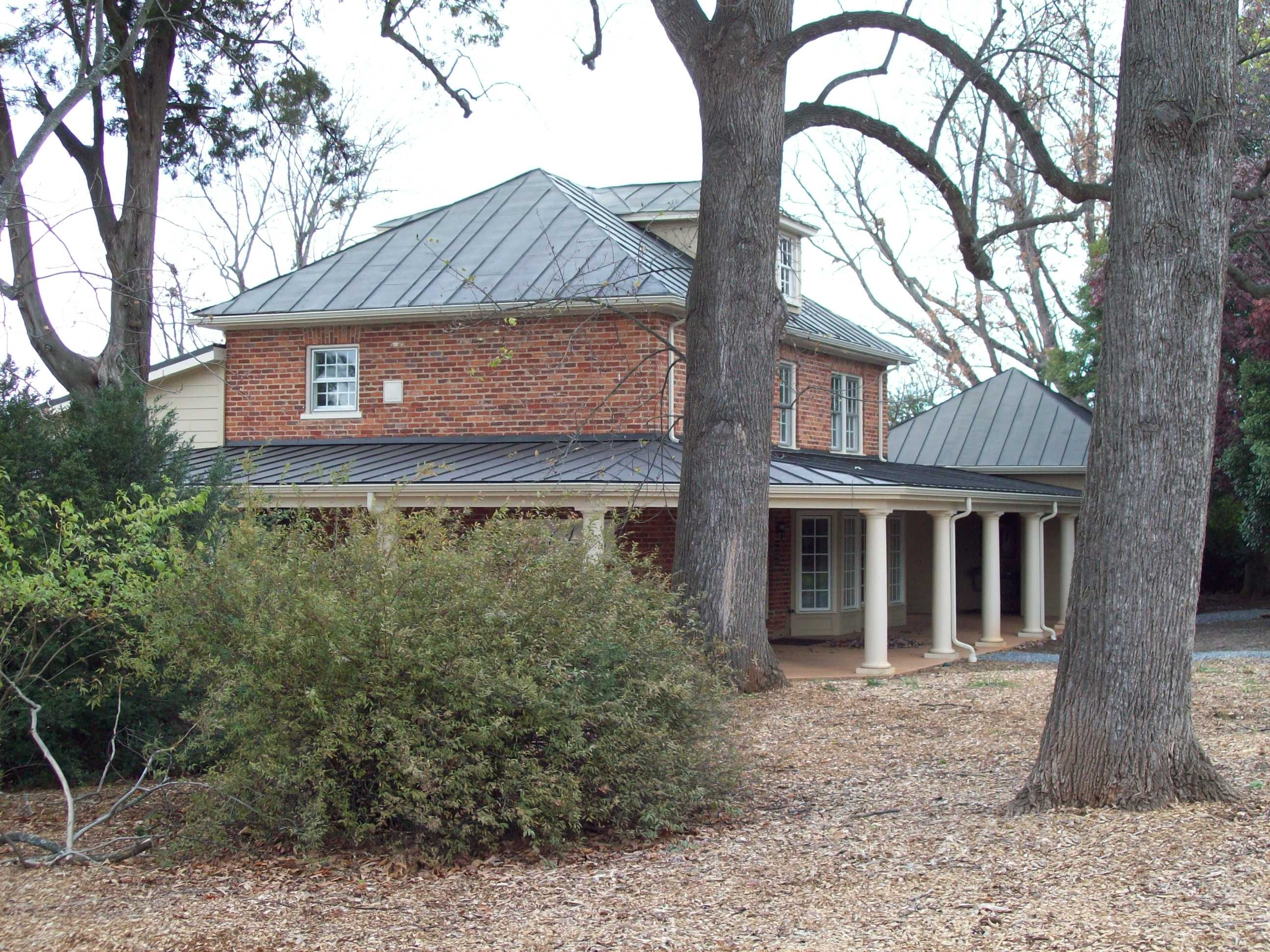
Sandusky's Visitor Center

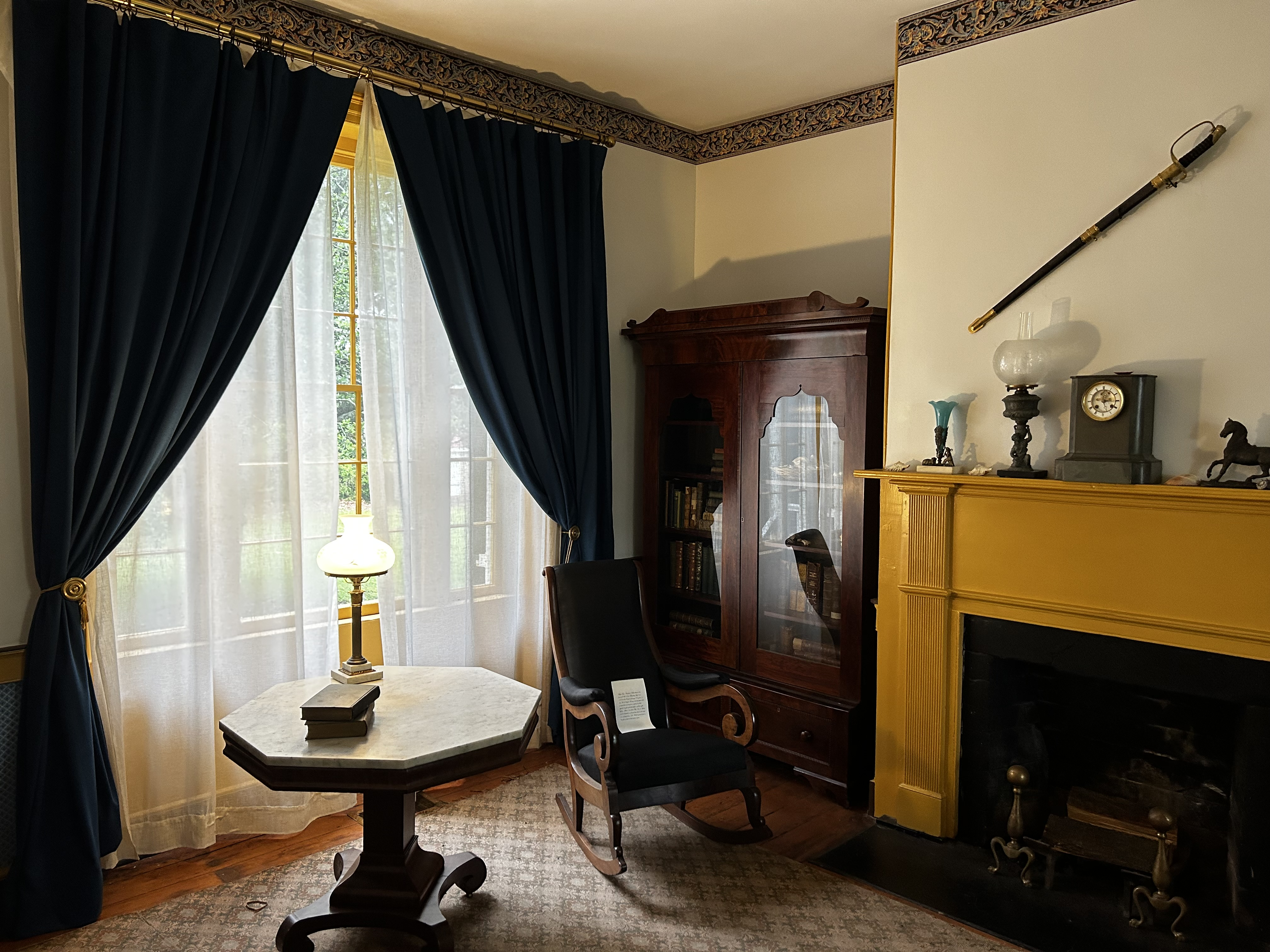
The sitting room of Sandusky
