= Great Cacapon Bridge =

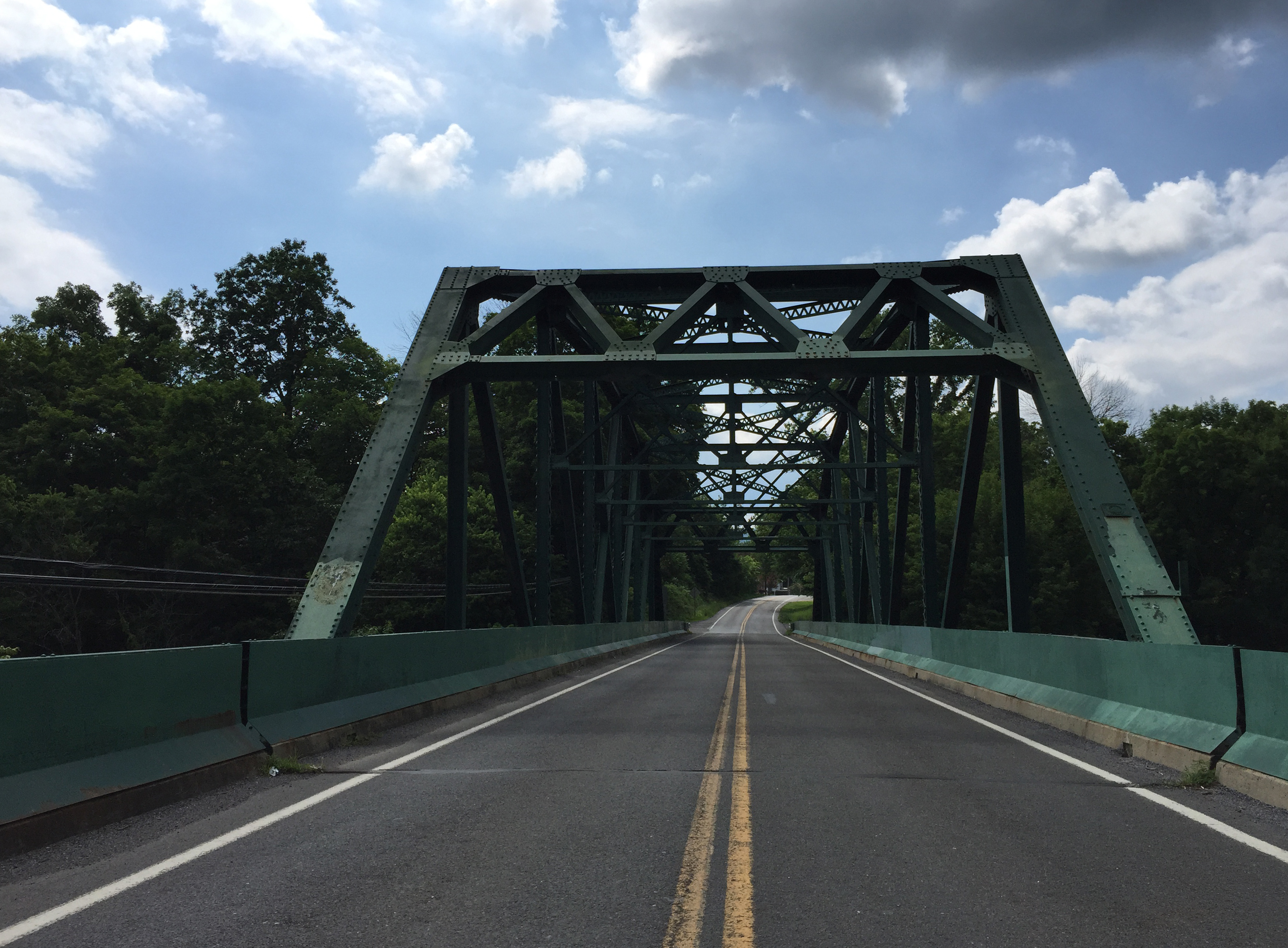
- Great Cacapon Bridge, June 2016
- Coordinates: 39°37′06″N 78°16′59″W
- Carries: WV 9
- Crosses: Cacapon River
- Locale: Morgan County, West Virginia, United States
- Official name: Thurman W. Whisner Memorial Bridge
- Other name: Great Cacapon Bridge
- Maintained by: West Virginia Division of Highways

Characteristics
- Design: Parker Through Truss with Rolled Steel Girders for approach spans

History
- Built: 1937
- Great Cacapon Bridge
- U.S. National Register of Historic Places
- NRHP reference No.: 100012205
- Added to NRHP: September 8, 2025

Location
- Interactive map of Great Cacapon Bridge

The Great Cacapon Bridge is located on WV Route 9 just east of the community of Great Cacapon in Morgan County, West Virginia. The main span is a 170-foot long (52 m) Parker through truss, a polygonal-top subtype of the Pratt type, with 50-foot long (15 m) rolled steel girders supporting multiple approach spans. The approach from the east is three spans, and the west approach is a single span extending from the pier supporting the west end of the truss to the abutment. The bridge represents an early use of long span rolled steel girders paired with steel trusses, since in the 1930s the largest rolled I-beams capable of being produced were limited to a depth of 36 inches (910 mm) and a length of 60 feet (18 m).

The bridge was constructed in 1937 with funding from the New Deal Program to replace an earlier bridge destroyed in the Saint Patrick's Day Flood of 1936. The bridge was built by the Roanoke Iron and Bridge Works Company of Virginia (bridge builder - superstructure), Gilbert Construction Company of Charleston (bridge builder - substructure), and R.W. Moore of Staunton (approaches).

In June 2024, the West Virginia Department of Highways formally dedicated the bridge as the Thurman W. Whisner Memorial Bridge. Whisner was a highway bridge engineer who had been born on a farm near Great Cacapon in 1951. He joined the highway department as a bridge inspector in 1969 before graduating from the West Virginia University Institute of Technology in 1974. Whisner resided in Great Cacapon working as a structural engineer from 1979 until his death in 2022.

The Great Cacapon Bridge was individually listed on the National Register of Historic Places on September 8, 2025, under both Criterion A for its association with changing transportation patterns, and Criterion C in the area of engineering, as a fine example of a Parker through truss bridge with very early use of girder-supported long approach spans.

For Fiscal Year 2024, the West Virginia Department of highways funded a $450,000 contract for a design study for the replacement of the Great Cacapon Bridge.
