= James Snedden =

- Born: September 19, 1849; Edinburgh, Scotland
- Died: June 14, 1919 (aged 69) (?)
- Burial place: Odd Fellows Cemetery, Lexington, MS; 33.1172°N 90.0340°W
- Military career
- Allegiance: USA
- Service: Union Army
- Service years: 1864-1865
- Rank: Principal Musician
- Units: Company E, 54th Pennsylvania Volunteer Infantry
- Conflicts: Battle of Piedmont
- Awards: Medal of Honor

James Snedden (September 19, 1849 – June 14, 1919 (?)) was born in Edinburgh, Scotland, and emigrated to the United States at an unknown date.

On February 23, 1864, during the Civil War, he was mustered in the Union Army at Johnstown, Pennsylvania, with the rank of Private, in Company E, 54th Pennsylvania Volunteer Infantry. He became a Musician, a non-combatant role, in that unit, rising to the rank of Principal Musician. (Note: No record seems to have survived of what instrument or instruments he played.) On June 5, 1864, the Union and Confederate armies met at Piedmont, Virginia. Colonel Jacob M. Campbell, commander of the 54th, ordered Snedden to take his musicians to the rear. Having done so, he took a rifle from a wounded comrade, went to the front, joined in the fighting, and captured Colonel Beuhring Jones, commander of the 60th Virginia Infantry . On May 31, 1865, after the end of the War, he was honorably mustered out of the Army.

He subsequently worked for the Union Pacific Railroad and the Fort Scott and Gulf Railroad, and later became a mine owner and operator.

On September 11, 1897, thirty-three years after Piedmont, he was presented with the Medal of Honor. His citation reads: (Note: Note that the vconline.org.uk citation uses the British DMY convention for dates, not the American MDY one.)

Left his place in the rear, took the rifle of a disabled soldier, and fought through the remainder of the action.

He died June 14, 1919, and is buried in the Odd Fellow Cemetery (PM) Lexington, MS.
