= William E. Jones (general) =

Confederate Army general (1824–1864)

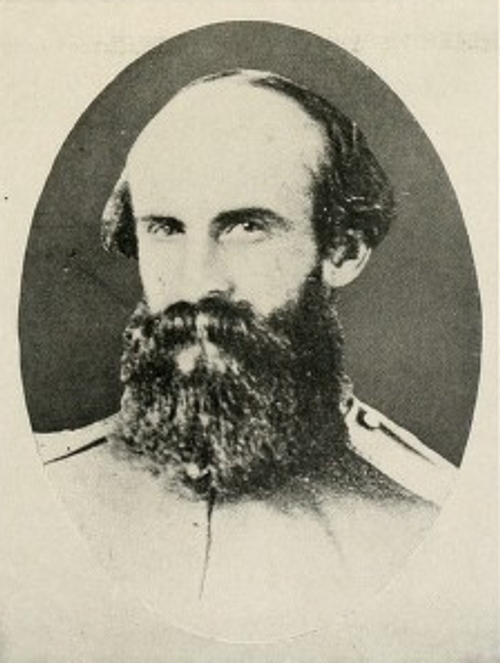
- Jones in uniform, c. 1862
- Born: William Edmondson Jones; May 9, 1824; Washington County, Virginia, U.S.
- Died: June 5, 1864 (aged 40); Piedmont, Virginia, C.S.
- Burial place: Old Glade Spring Presbyterian Church, Glade Spring, Virginia, U.S.
- Spouse: Eliza Margaret Dunn
- Military career
- Allegiance: United States; Confederate States
- Branch: United States Army; Confederate States Army
- Service years: 1848–1857 (U.S.); 1861–1864 (C.S.)
- Rank: First Lieutenant (USA); Brigadier General (CSA)
- Nickname: Grumble
- Commands: 7th Virginia Cavalry Regiment
- Conflicts: American Indian Wars; American Civil War

William Edmondson "Grumble" Jones (May 9, 1824 – June 5, 1864) was a Confederate cavalry general with a reputation for being a martinet to his troopers and fractious toward superiors, but acknowledged to be a good commander. After disagreements of a personal nature with J.E.B. Stuart, Jones's brigade was set to guarding supply lines and unavailable during a crucial juncture of the Gettysburg Campaign when Lee suffered from a lack of capable reconnaissance cavalry. As the personality clash between Jones and Stuart escalated, Jones faced charges for impertinence, and was transferred to separate him from Stuart. Jones was killed leading a counter-attack in the 1864 Battle of Piedmont.

== Early life and education ==
Jones was born in Washington County, Virginia. After graduating from Emory and Henry College in Virginia in 1844, he graduated from the United States Military Academy in 1848, ranking twelfth out of 48 cadets, and was commissioned a brevet second lieutenant in the U.S. Mounted Riflemen Regiment. He served with the cavalry fighting Indians in the west and was promoted to first lieutenant in 1854. His nickname, "Grumble", reflects his irritable disposition. His wife was washed from his arms and drowned in a shipwreck shortly after their marriage in 1852 while en route to Texas. He resigned his commission in 1857, and became a farmer near Glade Spring, Virginia.

== American Civil War ==
At the start of the Civil War, Jones joined the 1st Virginia Cavalry Regiment as a captain, commanding the Washington Mounted Rifles, a company William Willis Blackford (later JEB Stuart's adjutant) had raised for him. On May 9 he was promoted to major in Virginia's Provisional Army, and later that month both Jones and the regiment were transferred into the Confederate Army. Jones served under Col. J.E.B. Stuart in the First Battle of Bull Run in July 1861. The following month he was promoted to the rank of Colonel and was given command of the 1st Virginia Cavalry. Regular officer Jones put his new volunteers through meticulous training and personally upbraided anyone who was slow to learn how to perform standard drills to their commander's exacting standards.

In the fall of 1861 the Confederate forces underwent a major reorganization, during which the enlisted men could elect their officers. Jones was not re-elected to his post as commander of the 1st Virginia Cavalry; losing to Fitzhugh Lee.

That October he was appointed to command the 7th Virginia Cavalry Regiment in the Shenandoah Valley, where he briefly replaced the ailing Angus W. McDonald, and led the regiment operating along the Potomac River during the early winter months of 1862. In March 1862 Jones was briefly given command of all cavalry in the Valley District, but was recalled to Richmond shortly before Jackson's Valley Campaign.

Returning to eastern Virginia, he was part of Stuart's ostentatious raid around Major-General George B. McClellan's army preceding the Seven Days Battles. Jones was wounded in a skirmish at Orange Court House on August 2. His cavalry was distinguished in the Second Bull Run Campaign.

Jones had established himself a reputation as a "superb outpost officer" but had already alienated Stuart. Stuart expressed the opinion that Jones was the most difficult man in the army. Despite Stuart's protest, Lee promoted Jones to brigadier-general, and assigned to him to command the 4th Brigade of Stuart's Cavalry Division in the Army of Northern Virginia.

Jones was requested by Lieutenant-General Thomas J. "Stonewall" Jackson for the Valley District, and he took up the post on December 29, 1862.

In the spring of 1863, Jones and Brigadier-General John D. Imboden raided the Baltimore and Ohio Railroad west of Cumberland, Maryland, destroying much of the railroad and public property in the area, including the Burning Springs Complex on May 9, 1863. Rejoining Stuart, he fought in the largest cavalry engagement of the war, the Battle of Brandy Station, June 9, 1863, at the start of the Gettysburg campaign. He was surprised, as was all of Stuart's command, to be hit out of blue by Union cavalry under Major-General Alfred Pleasonton. Jones's brigade was outnumbered by the division of his West Point classmate, Brigadier-General John Buford, but it held its own and ended the fight with more horses and more and better small-arms than at the beginning, capturing two regimental colors, an artillery battery, and about 250 prisoners.

=== Battle of Gettysburg ===
In one of the huge cavalry parades ordered by Stuart that had attracted the attention of Union forces and led to the Battle of Brandy Station, Jones put an affront on Stuart by disrupting a passing review ceremony for guest of honor Robert E. Lee. Accustomed to good press, Stuart found himself criticised for ordering outrageous pageantry and then failing to maintain Confederate cavalry supremacy in a real battle. To make it worse, Stuart's bête noire Jones had been in the thick of the fighting and performed impressively at Brandy Station. By the beginning of the Gettysburg campaign, the function of cavalry was increasingly to be the eyes and ears of an army. John S. Mosby, once a protege of Jones, but now leading his own partisan ranger detachment, had given Stuart optimistic intelligence, which he seized on to propose a showy raid around the Union army. Lee had twice found similar cavalry probes by Stuart lasting a few days useful, and gave him discretionary orders for a new operation as part of the major offensive into the North.

Jones had so estranged Stuart that he chose to sideline the proven cavalry brigade commanded by Jones (and the similar one led by Beverly Robertson who had once been engaged to Stuart's wife) well away from the opportunity to distinguish themselves, either with Stuart or with Lee and the bulk of the army as it maneuvered in enemy territory. This left Lee with a couple of brigades of mounted partisan rangers, whom he distrusted for the vital work of probing enemy dispositions and screening the army from the enemy. Lee chose not to use the irregular brigades, and waited for the return of Stuart, but his sweep around the Union army took far longer than anticipated. Confederate blindness to the disposition and movements of Union forces during Stuart's eight day absence was a harbinger of insouciant reconnaissance that was widely thought to have been a major factor in Lee's tactics at the Battle of Gettysburg.

=== Battle of Fairfield ===
Before moving into Pennsylvania, General Robert E. Lee ordered Ewell to capture Harrisburg if practicable. On July 3, while Pickett's Charge was underway, the Union cavalry had had a unique opportunity to impede Lee's eventual retreat. Brig. Gen. Wesley Merritt's brigade departed from Emmitsburg with orders from cavalry commander Maj. Gen. Alfred Pleasonton to strike the Confederate right and rear along Seminary Ridge. Reacting to a report from a local civilian that there was a Confederate forage train near Fairfield, Merritt dispatched about 400 men in four squadrons from the 6th U.S. Cavalry under Major Samuel H. Starr to seize the wagons. Before they were able to reach the wagons, the 7th Virginia Cavalry, leading a column under Jones, intercepted the regulars, starting the minor Battle of Fairfield. Taking cover behind a post-and rail fence, the U.S. cavalrymen opened fire and caused the Virginians to retreat. Jones sent in the 6th Virginia Cavalry, which successfully charged and swarmed over the Union troopers, wounding and capturing Starr. There were 242 Union casualties, primarily prisoners, and 44 casualties among the Confederates. Despite the relatively small scale of this action, its result was that the strategically important Fairfield Road to the South Mountain passes remained open. a few days later. The Battle of Culpeper Court House was Jones' last action under Stuart's command.

Stuart, who since Gettysburg had seen his reputation in the South and the Confederate army decline precipitously, court-martialed Jones for insulting him. Robert E. Lee was, by this time, aware of the personality clash and intervened to have Jones exonerated and transferred to the Trans-Allegheny Department in West Virginia. He recruited a brigade of cavalry there and campaigned in eastern Tennessee with Lieutenant-General James Longstreet's forces during the winter and spring of 1864.

=== Death and legacy ===
In May, Jones assumed command of the Confederate forces in the Shenandoah Valley who were defending against the halting advance of Major-General David Hunter towards Lynchburg, Virginia, in the Valley Campaigns of 1864. In the Battle of Piedmont on June 5, 1864, Jones was shot in the head and killed while leading a charge against a superior attacking force.

Jones is buried in the Old Glade Spring Presbyterian Church graveyard, Glade Spring, Virginia. His fellow cavalry general, Brig. Gen. Imboden, wrote that Jones

... was an old army officer, brave as a lion and had seen much service, and was known as a hard fighter. He was a man, however, of high temper, morose and fretful. He held the fighting qualities of the enemy in great contempt, and never would admit the possibility of defeat where the odds against him were not much over two to one.

== In popular culture ==
The bluegrass band The Dixie Bee-Liners have a biographical ballad about Jones on their 2008 album Ripe (Pinecastle Records) entitled "Grumble Jones". The song was co-written by band members Buddy Woodward, Brandi Hart, and Blue Highway guitarist Tim Stafford.

A street in Centreville, Virginia, is named Grumble Jones Court.

The book "Lies, Lore and Gossip" mentions General Grumble Jones on pages 53–54. He and his 300 soldiers are described as confiscating "horses and other things" in West Virginia. It mentions the execution of two men who had ambushed them and the failed execution of another.

== See also ==
- List of Confederate States Army generals
