= David Hunter =

American Union general during the Civil War (1802–1886)

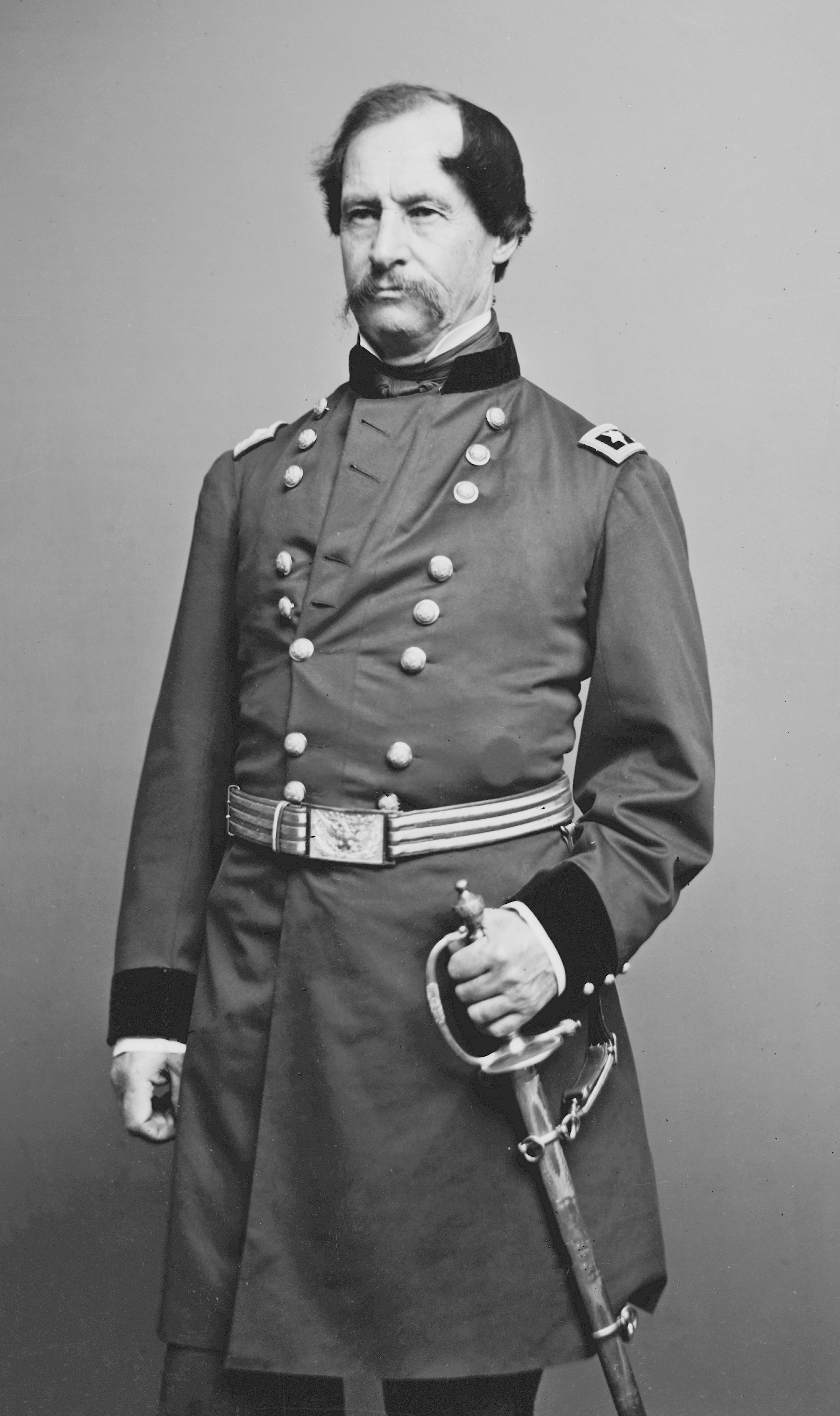
- Born: July 21, 1802; Troy, New York, U.S.
- Died: February 2, 1886 (aged 83); Washington, D.C., U.S.
- Burial place: Princeton Cemetery, Princeton, New Jersey, U.S.
- Education: USMA
- Military career
- Allegiance: United States of America
- Branch: U.S. Army (Union Army)
- Service years: 1822–1836; 1841–1866
- Rank: Major general
- Nickname: "Black Dave"
- Commands: Department of Kansas; Department of the West; Department of the South
- Conflicts: Second Seminole War; Mexican–American War; American Civil War; Manassas campaign; First Battle of Bull Run (WIA); Siege of Fort Pulaski; Battle of Piedmont; Battle of Lynchburg

David Hunter (July 21, 1802 – February 2, 1886) was an American military officer. He served as a Union general during the American Civil War. He achieved notability for his unauthorized 1862 order (rescinded a month after it was made) emancipating slaves in three Southern states, for his leadership of Union troops during the Valley Campaigns of 1864, and as the president of the military commission trying the conspirators involved in the assassination of U.S. President Abraham Lincoln.

== Early life and education ==
Hunter (son of Andrew Hunter and Mary Stockton) was born in Troy, New York, or Princeton, New Jersey. He was the cousin of writer-illustrator David Hunter Strother (who would also serve as a Union Army general). His maternal grandfather was Richard Stockton, a signer of the United States Declaration of Independence.

After graduating from the United States Military Academy in 1822, Hunter was commissioned a second lieutenant in the 5th U.S. Infantry Regiment. Records of his military service prior to the Civil War contain significant gaps. From 1828 to 1831, he was stationed on the northwest frontier, at Fort Dearborn (Chicago). There he met and married Maria Kinzie, a daughter of John Kinzie, considered the city's first permanent white resident. He served in the infantry for 11 years, and was promoted to captain of the 1st U.S. Dragoons in 1833.

He resigned from the army in July 1836 and moved to Illinois, where he worked as a real estate agent or speculator. He rejoined the Army in November 1841 as a paymaster and was promoted to major in March 1842. One source claims that he saw action in the Second Seminole War (1838–42) and the Mexican–American War (1846–48).

In 1860, Hunter was stationed at Fort Leavenworth, Kansas. He began a correspondence with Abraham Lincoln, emphasizing his own strong anti-slavery views. This relationship engendered political influence: after winning election to the presidency, Lincoln invited Hunter to ride on his inaugural train in February 1861 from Springfield, Illinois, to Washington, D.C. During this duty, Hunter suffered a dislocated collarbone at Buffalo due to the crowd pressing the president-elect.

== Career ==
=== American Civil War ===
Soon after the firing on Fort Sumter, Hunter was promoted to colonel of the 6th U.S. Cavalry. Three days later, May 17, 1861, his political connection to the Lincoln administration resulted in his being appointed as the fourth-ranking brigadier general of volunteers, commanding a brigade in the Department of Washington. He was wounded in the neck and cheek while commanding a division under Irvin McDowell at the First Battle of Bull Run in July 1861. In August, he was promoted to major general of volunteers.

He served as a division commander in the Western Army under Major General John C. Frémont, and was appointed as commander of the Western Department on November 2, 1861, after Frémont was relieved of command due to his attempt to emancipate the slaves of rebellious slave holders. Hunter did not last long in this position, and within two months was reassigned to the Department of Kansas, a post where there was little chance of getting into trouble. He did not accept his exile gracefully and wrote a series of fulminating protest letters to the president, who finally gave in to his complaints. In March 1862, Hunter was transferred again to command the Department of the South and the X Corps.

Hunter served as president of the court-martial of Major General Fitz John Porter. (He was convicted for his actions at the Second Battle of Bull Run, but was exonerated by an 1878 Board of Officers.) He also was assigned to the committee that investigated the loss of Harpers Ferry in the Maryland Campaign. He served briefly as the assistant inspector general of the Department of the Gulf.

==== General Orders No. 7 and 11 ====
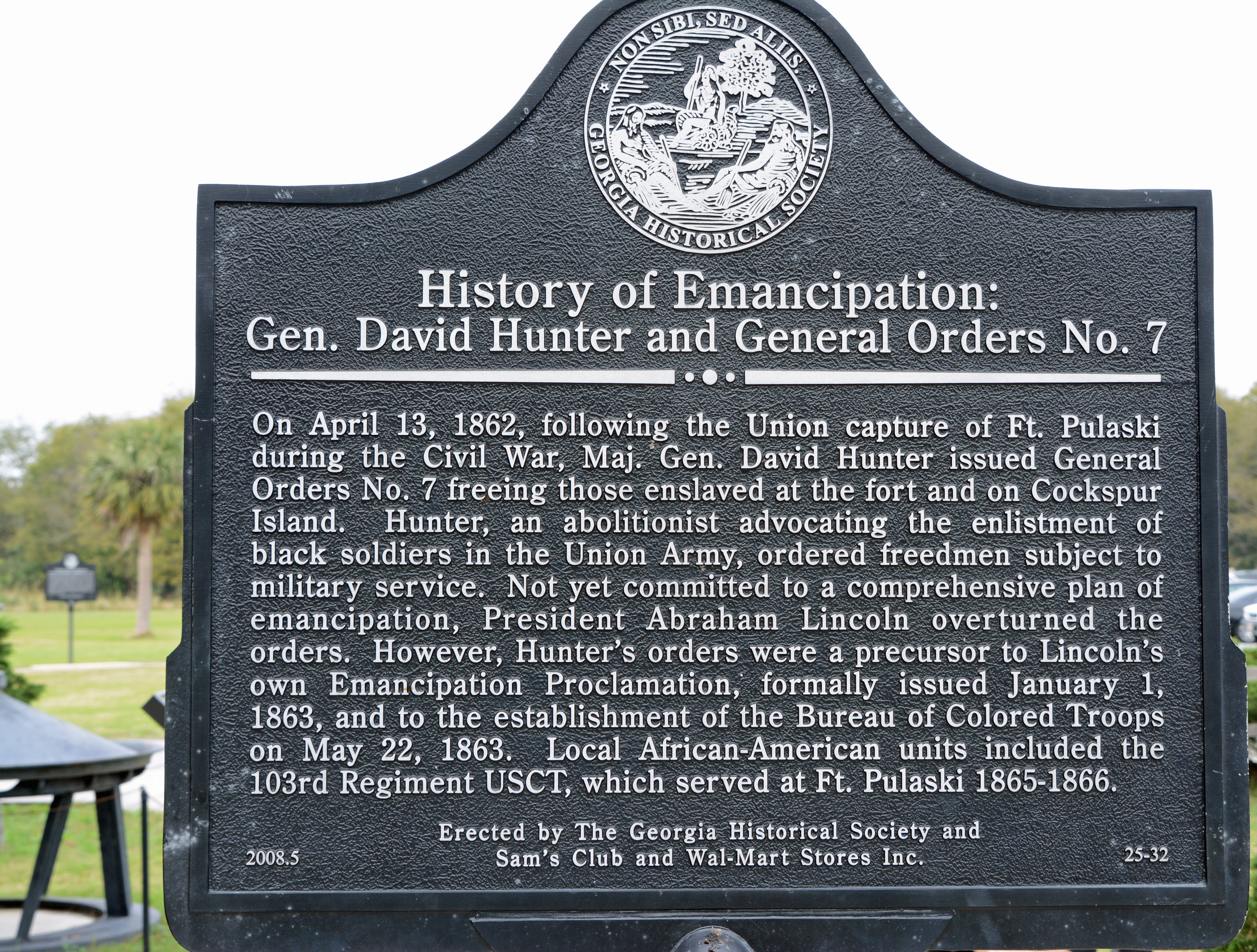
Historical marker about General Orders No. 7, erected by the Georgia Historical Society in 2008

After the Battle of Fort Pulaski in April 1862, when Hunter's troops bombarded and reclaimed the Confederate-held fort at the mouth of the Savannah River, Hunter issued General Orders 7 and 11. General Orders 7, issued on April 13, freed slaves in the fort and on Cockspur Island. Following the success of this order, Hunter hoped to further his abolitionist cause beyond the confines of this small Georgia island.

Hunter was also a strong advocate of arming black men as soldiers for the Union cause. He planned to form multiple segregated regiments but first needed to grow his recruitment pool. In May 1862, Hunter caused controversy by issuing General Orders 11, an order emancipating slaves in the states of Georgia, South Carolina, and Florida:

The three States of Georgia, Florida and South Carolina, comprising the military department of the south, having deliberately declared themselves no longer under the protection of the United States of America, and having taken up arms against the said United States, it becomes a military necessity to declare them under martial law. This was accordingly done on the 25th day of April, 1862. Slavery and martial law in a free country are altogether incompatible; the persons in these three States — Georgia, Florida, and South Carolina— heretofore held as slaves, are therefore declared forever free.

— Maj. Gen. David Hunter, Department of the South, General Order No. 11, May 9, 1862

President Lincoln rescinded the order on May 19, because he was concerned about its political effects in the border states, which he was trying to keep neutral. Their leaders advocated instead a gradual emancipation with compensation for slave owners. Despite Lincoln's concerns that immediate emancipation in the South might drive some slave-holding Unionists to support the Confederacy, the national mood was quickly moving against slavery, especially within the Army.

The president and Congress had already enacted several laws during the war to severely restrict the institution, beginning with the First Confiscation Act in August 1861 and culminating in Lincoln's own Emancipation Proclamation issued in September 1862, and to take effect January 1, 1863. Concerned Confederate slaveholders had worried since before the war started that its eventual goal would become the abolition of slavery and they reacted strongly to the Union effort to emancipate Confederate slaves. Confederate President Jefferson Davis issued orders to the Confederate army that Hunter was to be considered a "felon to be executed if captured".

==== Controversy over enlistment of ex-slaves ====
Undeterred by the president's reluctance and intent on extending freedom to potential black soldiers, Hunter again flouted orders from the federal government. He enlisted ex-slaves as soldiers from occupied districts in South Carolina without permission from the War Department. He formed the first such Union Army regiment, the 1st South Carolina (African Descent). He was initially ordered to disband it, but eventually got approval from Congress for his action. This action incensed pro-slavery border state politicians, and Representative Charles A. Wickliffe (D-KY) sponsored a resolution demanding a response.

Hunter sent a defiant letter on June 23, 1862, to Congress, reminding them of his authority as a commanding officer in a war zone:

. . . I reply that no regiment of "Fugitive Slaves" has been, or is being organized in this Department. There is, however, a fine regiment of persons whose late masters are "Fugitive Rebels"--men who everywhere fly before the appearance of the National Flag, leaving their servants behind them to shift as best they can for themselves. . . . So far, indeed, are the loyal persons composing this regiment from seeking to avoid the presence of their late owners, that they are now, one and all, working with remarkable industry to place themselves in a position to go in full and effective pursuit of their fugacious and traitorous proprietors. . . . the instructions given to Brig. Gen. T. W. Sherman by the Hon. Simon Cameron, late Secretary of War, and turned over to me by succession for my guidance,--do distinctly authorize me to employ all loyal persons offering their services in defence of the Union and for the suppression of this Rebellion in any manner I might see fit. . . . In conclusion I would say it is my hope,--there appearing no possibility of other reinforcements owing to the exigencies of the Campaign in the Peninsula,--to have organized by the end of next Fall, and to be able to present to the Government, from forty eight to fifty thousand of these hardy and devoted soldiers."

While the increasingly abolitionist Republicans in Congress were amused by the order, border state pro-slavery politicians, such as Wickliffe and Robert Mallory (D-KY), were not. Mallory described the scene in Congress following the reading of the order as follows:

The scene was one of which I think this House should forever be ashamed . . . A spectator in the gallery would have supposed we were witnessing here the performance of a buffoon or of a low farce actor upon the stage . . . The reading was received with loud applause and boisterous manifestations of approbation by the Republican members of the House . . . It was a scene, in my opinion, disgraceful to the American Congress.

The War Department eventually forced Hunter to abandon this scheme, but the government nonetheless soon took action to expand the enlistment of black men as military laborers. Congress approved the Confiscation Act of 1862, which effectively freed all blacks working within the armed forces by forbidding Union soldiers to aid in the return of fugitive slaves.

In 1863, Hunter wrote a letter to Confederate President Jefferson Davis protesting against the Confederate army's brutal mistreatment of captured black U.S. soldiers. He attacked the Confederates' claims to be fighting for freedom, listing the abuses they committed against human beings under slavery :

You say you are fighting for liberty. Yes you are fighting for liberty: liberty to keep four millions of your fellow-beings in ignorance and degradation;–liberty to separate parents and children, husband and wife, brother and sister;–liberty to steal the products of their labor, exacted with many a cruel lash and bitter tear;–liberty to seduce their wives and daughters, and to sell your own children into bondage;–liberty to kill these children with impunity, when the murder cannot be proven by one of pure white blood. This is the kind of liberty–the liberty to do wrong–which Satan, Chief of the fallen Angels, was contending for when he was cast into Hell.

==== The Valley and "Scorched Earth" ====
In the Valley Campaigns of 1864, Union Maj. Gen. Franz Sigel was ordered by Lt. Gen. Ulysses S. Grant to move into the Shenandoah Valley, threaten railroads and the agricultural economy there, and distract Robert E. Lee while Grant fought him in eastern Virginia. Sigel did a poor job, losing immediately at the Battle of New Market to a force that included cadets from the Virginia Military Institute (VMI). Hunter replaced Sigel in command of the Army of the Shenandoah and the Department of West Virginia on May 21, 1864. Grant ordered Hunter to employ scorched earth tactics similar to those that would be used later in that year during Sherman's March to the Sea; he was to move through Staunton to Charlottesville and Lynchburg, "living off the country" and destroying the Virginia Central Railroad "beyond possibility of repair for weeks." Lee was concerned enough about Hunter that he dispatched a corps under Lt. Gen. Jubal A. Early to deal with him.

On June 5, Hunter defeated Maj. Gen. William E. "Grumble" Jones at the Battle of Piedmont. Following orders, he moved up the Valley (southward) through Staunton to Lexington, destroying military targets and other industries (such as blacksmiths and stables) that could be used to support the Confederacy. After reaching Lexington, his troops burned down VMI on June 11 in retaliation of that institution sending cadets to fight at New Market. Hunter ordered the home of former governor John Letcher burned in retaliation for its absent owner's having issued "a violent and inflammatory proclamation ... inciting the population of the country to rise and wage guerrilla warfare on my troops." Hunter also wreaked havoc on Washington College in Lexington, later Washington and Lee University. According to Fitzhugh Lee's biography of his uncle, Robert E. Lee, "[Hunter] had no respect for colleges, or the peaceful pursuits of professors and students, or the private dwellings of citizens, though occupied by women and children only, and during his three days occupancy of Lexington in June, 1864, the college buildings were dismantled, apparatus destroyed, and the books mutilated."

Hunter's campaign in the Valley came to an end after he was defeated by Early at the Battle of Lynchburg on June 19. His headquarters was at Sandusky House, listed on the National Register of Historic Places in 1982, and now operated as a house museum. After the battle, Hunter retreated across the Allegheny Mountains into West Virginia, thereby taking his army out of the war altogether for a few weeks and allowing Early a free rein in the Valley. Though this retreat was widely criticized, Ulysses Grant in his Memoirs excused it as follows: "General Hunter, owing to a want of ammunition to give battle, retired from before the place. Unfortunately, this want of ammunition left him no choice of route for his return but by the way of the Gauley and Kanawha rivers, thence up the Ohio River, returning to Harper's Ferry by way of the Baltimore and Ohio Railroad." Hunter would maintain until his dying day that it had been a strategically sound move and he wrote a series of persistent letters to Secretary of War Edwin Stanton and President Lincoln arguing that the retreat was entirely justified. He badgered Grant with letters a few months later arguing that the army and officers he inherited from Franz Sigel were below average, and that he had never been told that he had any assignment to defend Washington, D.C. After the war, he wrote a letter to Robert E. Lee asking if he as a fellow soldier did not agree with the soundness of the retreat. Lee, who had a loathing of Hunter, wrote back that he had no clue what the exact strategic value of retreating into West Virginia was, but that it had been extremely helpful to himself and the Confederate cause.

The burning of the Virginia Military Institute by Hunter also angered the Confederates and made them more vengeful than before. After retaking possession of the Valley, Early described the scene as "truly heart-rending. Houses had been burned, and helpless women and children left without shelter. The country had been stripped of provisions and many families left without a morsel to eat. Furniture and bedding had been cut to pieces, and old men and women and children robbed of all the clothing they had except that on their backs. Ladies trunks had been rifled and their dresses torn to pieces in mere wantonness. Even the negro girls had lost their little finery. . . At Lexington he had burned the Military Institute, with all of its contents, including its library and scientific apparatus; and Washington College had been plundered and the statue of George Washington stolen. The residence of Ex-Governor Letcher at that place had been burned by orders, and but a few minutes given Mrs. Letcher and her family to leave the house. . . [A] Mr. Creigh, had been hung, because, on a former occasion, he had killed a straggling and marauding Federal soldier while in the act of insulting and outraging the ladies of his family."

On August 1, Grant placed Maj. Gen Philip Sheridan in command of the effort to destroy Jubal Early's army. The Shenandoah, Maryland, and Washington, D.C., area all fell under Hunter's military department, but Grant had no intention of allowing Hunter any direct command over the campaign against Early. He therefore informed him that he could retain department command on paper while Sheridan did the active field campaigning. Hunter however declined this offer, stating that he had been so beset by contradictory War Department orders that he had no idea where Jubal Early's army even was, and he would rather just turn everything over to Sheridan. Grant immediately accepted and relieved Hunter of his post. He would serve in no more combat commands. He was promoted to brevet major general in the regular army on March 13, 1865, an honor that was relatively common for senior officers late in the war.

== Later life and death ==
Hunter served in the honor guard at the funeral of Abraham Lincoln and accompanied his body back to Springfield. He was the president of the military commission trying the conspirators of Lincoln's assassination, from May 8 to July 15, 1865. He retired from the army in July 1866. He was the author of Report of the Military Services of Gen. David Hunter, U.S.A., during the War of the Rebellion, published in 1873.

Hunter died in Washington, D.C., and is buried at the Princeton Cemetery in Princeton, New Jersey.

== In popular culture ==
- Colm Meaney portrays Hunter in the 2011 film The Conspirator.

== See also ==
- List of American Civil War generals (Union)
- Battle of Fort Pulaski

== Cited sources ==
- Berlin, Ira, et al. Free at Last: A Documentary History of Slavery, Freedom, and the Civil War. New York: The New Press, 1992. ISBN 1-56584-120-4.
