= 10 May 1776 petition =

- Created: Before May 10, 1776
- Presented: May 10, 1776
- Location: Unknown (presumed lost)
- Author(s): Thomas Lewis, Sampson Mathews, Samuel McDowell, et al.
- Purpose: To create a permanent and independent union of states and national government separate from Great Britain

The 10 May 1776 petition, also known as the Augusta Declaration or the Memorial of Augusta County Committee, May 10, 1776, was a statement presented by the Augusta County, Virginia Committee of Safety to the Fifth Virginia Convention in Williamsburg, Virginia on May 10, 1776. The petition announced the necessity of the Thirteen Colonies to form a permanent and independent union of states and national government separate from Great Britain, with whom the Colonies were at war.

When the Fifth Virginia Convention assembled on May 6, 1776, independence was a leading issue. Several of the delegates had already been instructed by their counties to pursue independence, and others had come with resolutions for independence in hand. The 10 May 1776 petition was the first officially recorded statement on the subject, being introduced by Thomas Lewis, on behalf of the Augusta County Committee of Safety on May 10. On May 15, the Convention declared Virginia wholly independent of Great Britain, and called for state papers (a declaration of rights and constitution), foreign alliances, and a confederation of the colonies. These resolutions were forwarded to the Second Continental Congress and introduced as the Lee Resolution, which initiated the drafting of the United States Declaration of Independence, the Model Treaty (foreign policy), and the Articles of Confederation (the first U.S. constitution), respectively.

Later historians have described the Convention's May 15 resolves as partially responsive to the 10 May 1776 petition. The petition itself is presumed lost, with only an abstract surviving in the notations of the official journal of the Fifth Virginia Convention.

== The 10 May 1776 petition ==
On May 10, 1776, Thomas Lewis introduced the 10 May 1776 petition to the Fifth Virginia Convention on behalf of the Augusta County, Virginia Committee of Safety. Specifics of the petition are unknown, as it is currently lost. The abstract of the document was recorded in the journal of the Convention as such:

A representation from the committee of the county of Augusta was presented to the Convention, and read: setting forth the present unhappy situation of the country, and, from the ministerial measures of vengeance now pursuing, representing the necessity of making the confederacy of the United Colonies the most perfect, independent, and lasting; and of framing an equal, free, and liberal government, that may bear the test of all future ages.

This was the first officially documented proposal for the creation of a permanent and independent union of states and national government from any of the Thirteen Colonies.

=== Fifth Virginia Convention ===
The Fifth Virginia Convention convened on May 6, 1776. Thomas Lewis and Samuel McDowell served as delegates from Augusta County.

When the convention began, three counties (Cumberland, Charlotte, and James City) had already drafted resolutions for independence. Delegates from several others had come to Williamsburg with prepared statements on the issue, while most others had come knowing the question would be addressed. Over the first several sessions, the Convention dealt with matters largely related to the ongoing war effort. On May 10, the fifth session of the Convention, Thomas Lewis introduced the 10 May 1776 petition on behalf of the Augusta County Committee of Safety. On May 14, the Convention broke into a committee to debate the question of independence in full. The following day, May 15, the committee came to a unanimously agreement "to propose to Congress to declare the United Colonies free and independent States, absolved from all allegiance to, or dependence upon, the Crown or Parliament of Great Britain".

The Convention adopted resolutions calling for:

- state papers (a declaration of rights and constitution)
- foreign alliances
- a confederation of the colonies

Virginia thereby became the first colony to instruct its delegates in Congress to introduce both a resolution for independence and a federal union of the colonies.

=== On to Congress ===
These resolutions were forwarded to Richard Henry Lee, the Virginia representative to the Continental Congress, who introduced them to that body on June 7, almost verbatim:

Resolved, That these United Colonies are, and of right ought to be, free and independent States, that they are absolved from all allegiance to the British Crown, and that all political connection between them and the State of Great Britain is, and ought to be, totally dissolved.

That it is expedient forthwith to take the most effectual measures for forming foreign Alliances.

That a plan of confederation be prepared and transmitted to the respective Colonies for their consideration and approbation.

The Congress organized into groups to draft statements for each resolution. These efforts resulted in the creation of the United States Declaration of Independence, July 4, 1776; the Model Treaty (foreign policy), September 17, 1776; and the Articles of Confederation (first U.S. constitution), March 1, 1781.

== Augusta County Committee of Safety members ==
While the 10 May 1776 petition is presumed lost, at least one 1776 petition from the Augusta County Committee of Safety survives with its signatories intact. This petition, dated November 9, 1776, and which relates to religion and taxation, is signed by the following:

- Thomas Lewis
- Sampson Mathews
- Samuel McDowell
- N. Thompson
- Michael Bowyer
- Alexander Sinclair
- William Bowyer
- Ja's Tate
- William McPheeters
- John Gilmore
- William Stephenson
- William Lewis
- John Cyle Jr.
- James Steel
- Abraham Smith

== Contemporary references ==
Several contemporary references to the 10 May 1776 petition exist outside of the journal of the Fifth Virginia Convention. Among them:

- Gabriel Jones, Clerk of Hampshire County, may reference the petition in an irascible letter to George Washington, on June 6, 1777, in which he expresses contempt for the people of Augusta: "These wretches, I mean inhabitants, of Augusta have forgot when they petitioned the Assembly for abolishing the established church and to declare independancy [sic] how they promised their lives and fortunes should be spent in supporting the Cause if their humble prayer should be granted . . ."
- James Madison, in a 1827 manuscript, copied the abstract of the 10 May 1776 petition verbatim as found in the journal of the Fifth Virginia Convention, with queries as to the date and location of the document. An editor for U.S. National Archives notes, "Clearly pertinent to [Madison's] subject, [the 10 May 1776 petition] must have attracted his special interest . . ."

== Legacy ==
"It [the 10 May 1776 petition] is the first deliberate expression of the policy of establishing an independent state government and a permanent confederation of the States which our parliamentary journals contain; for, although several counties had expressed a resolution to sustain the Conventions in all measures which should be deemed necessary for the public weal, and had shown a spirit equal to every emergency, none had made so direct and so explicit a representation of the mode of redress which the crisis required . . . "

This memorial was presented five days before the grand committee. . . made that report recommending a declaration of independence and a formation of a state government wholly independent of the British Crown. This memorial from Augusta . . .deserves to be stereotyped as the Magna Charta of the West."

— Hugh Blair Grigsby

Historian Pauline Maier identifies more than ninety 'declarations of independence' that were issued throughout the Thirteen Colonies from April to July 1776. Among these were the Halifax Resolves, which on April 12 authorized the North Carolina delegates to the Continental Congress to vote in favor of independence should such a vote reach the floor; and the Rhode Island Act of Renunciation, which on May 4 officially renounced that colony's allegiance to George III. In Virginia, several counties adopted resolutions in favor of independence by the end of April: Cumberland County On April 22; Charlotte County on April 23; James City on April 24.

A confederation of the colonies had also been proposed by this time. Benjamin Franklin had introduced a plan for confederation of the thirteen colonies during the July, 1775 session of the Continental Congress. This plan, which was not adopted, left open the possibility for reconciliation with Britain (aspects of his plan would be revived for the Articles of Confederation). In Virginia, Patrick Henry had been a supporter of confederation. A resolution he authored for the Fifth Virginia Convention and debated May 15 called for the independence of all thirteen colonies, which he intended to be a step toward confederation. Letters he would write to both John Adams and Richard Henry Lee on May 20 suggested the importance he placed on the issue.

Hugh Blair Grigsby, 19th century Virginia historian, states that while several bodies had declared or cleared the way for a vote for independence, and while Congress had, also on May 10, instructed the colonies to form temporary governments to address the domestic needs of their people, no one in the colonies had yet laid out, as did the Committee of Safety from Augusta County, Virginia, a proposal for the creation of a permanent and independent union of states and national government for the Colonies. Grigsby states that this declaration is analogous to England's Magna Carta, which concerned the medieval relationship between English monarch and barons, but has come to be seen as an iconic statement of the rights of ordinary people.

A writer for an 1887 issue of The Nation states: "The distinction [to which Grigsby refers] is too technical to be of great value; at best, Augusta County was a year behind Mecklenburg, and far less outspoken than Buckingham, whose delegates to the Virginia Convention were bluntly instructed "to cause a total and final separation from Great Britain to take place as soon as possible."" Grigsby indeed notes that the Buckingham County statement, published June 14, 1776, but probably written May 13, is "the only paper which can stand near [the 10 May 1776 petition]." Others have noted that the Mecklenburg Resolves, while radical, left open the possibility of reconciliation with Great Britain and were not a declaration that the people of Mecklenburg County were free and independent of The Crown.

20th century historians have viewed the May 15 resolutions of the Fifth Virginia Convention as partially responsive to the 10 May 1776 petition.

== Bibliography ==
- Grigsby, Hugh Blair (1890). The History of the Virginia Federal Convention of 1788: with some account of some eminent Virginians of that era who were members of the body. Richmond, Virginia: Virginia Historical Society.
- Grigsby, Hugh Blair (1855). The Virginia Convention of 1776. Richmond : J.W. Randolph. OCLC 3886825.
- Grigsby, Hugh Blair (1890). Washington and Lee University (1890). Historical Papers, Volumes 1-2. Lexington, Virginia: The New York Public Library. p. 88.
- Jensen, Merrill. The Founding of a Nation: A History of the American Revolution, 1763–1776. New York: Oxford University Press, 1968.
- Van Schreeven, William; Scribner, Robert; Tarter, Brent (1973). Revolutionary Virginia, the road to independence, vol. 7. Independence and the Fifth convention. Charlottesville, Virginia: University Press of Virginia. OCLC 802770.
- Virginia House of Delegates (1776). The Proceedings of the Convention of Delegates Held at the Capital, in the City of Williamsburg, in the Colony of Virginia, on the 6th of May, 1776. Richmond, Virginia: Virginia House of Delegates.
