= James Waddel =

Irish American Presbyterian preacher

- Born: July 1739; Newry, Ireland
- Died: September 17, 1805 (aged 66)
- Occupation: pastor

James Waddel (or Waddell, July 1739 – September 17, 1805) was an Irish American Presbyterian preacher from Virginia noted for his eloquence. He was a founding trustee of Liberty Hall (later Washington and Lee University), when it was made into a college in 1776. The family name has had various spellings and pronunciations. Waddel's descendants have typically pronounced "Waddell" with a stress on the final syllable and have spelled it with two Ls.

== Early and family life ==
James Waddel was born in Newry, Ireland, in July 1739. His parents, Thomas and Janetta Waddel, emigrated to the United States later that same year, settling in southeastern Pennsylvania near the Delaware line. North Carolina-born Rev. Moses Waddel (1770-1840) is reputedly a cousin. When James was about twelve years old, he suffered a hand injury. This incapacitated him so his father thought it necessary for him to be educated, so that he could support himself. He was educated at the historic 'Log College' (now West Nottingham Academy) at Nottingham, Pennsylvania and was taught by Rev. Dr. Samuel Finley, D.D. Waddel became so proficient in ancient languages that he became a tutor there when he was just fifteen years old. He then became an assistant teacher in Reverend Robert Smith's academy in Pequea, Lancaster County.

Later, in Lancaster County, Virginia, James met Mary Gordon, the daughter of Mary Gordon (Harrison) and James Gordon, a wealthy and influential planter. In 1767 James and Mary were married at her father's home (later renamed Verville), and moved into the "Honeymoon Cottage" on the property near the intersection of two branches of the Corrotoman River. The couple eventually had ten children, of whom nine children survived to adulthood as described below.

== Ministry ==
When nineteen or twenty years old, Waddel moved to Louisa County, Virginia, where he became a tutor. Meriwether Lewis was one of his students, as later would be future U.S. President James Madison, and Virginia governor and U.S. Senator James Barbour.

Under the influence of Samuel Davies, whose circuit included Hanover and Louisa Counties Waddel decided to study for the ministry. He studied theology under John Todd and was licensed to preach in 1761. The next year, he became pastor of Presbyterian churches in Virginia's Northern Neck. Waddel started several churches in Northumberland and Lancaster counties, introducing the Presbyterian Church into areas where previously only the Anglican Church existed. Patrick Henry classed Waddel with Samuel Davies as one of the two greatest orators he had ever heard, and James Madison reputedly said: "He has spoiled me for all other preaching,".

When the American Revolutionary War began, the Waddel family moved to the Tinkling Spring church in Augusta County and also preached in Staunton. He purchased a large farm called "Springhill" on the South River by Waynesboro. During the war, Waddel made many addresses to soldiers encouraging them to fight; one stirring sermon in particular was having been given to the forces of Campbell, McDowell, and Moffett, while assembled at Midway in preparation to meet the army of Charles Cornwallis in North Carolina.

Waddel became one of the founding trustee of Liberty Hall, formerly the Augusta Academy, when in 1776 it was renamed in a burst of revolutionary fervor and relocated to Lexington, Virginia. Other prominent founding trustees included Andrew Lewis, Thomas Lewis, Samuel McDowell, Sampson Mathews, George Moffett, and William Preston. Finally chartered in 1782, Liberty Hall was again renamed, to Washington College and finally Washington and Lee University. It is the ninth oldest institution of higher education in the country.

In 1785 Waddel settled on an estate in Louisa County, where he supplied vacant pulpits and ran a classical school. He visited George Washington the next year.

Cataracts blinded Waddel about 1787 (at age 48), but he continued teaching and writing as well as preaching with great industry and without interruption, becoming known as "the blind preacher." Waddel was described as tall and erect with fair complexion and blue eyes. He was invariably described as cheerful, happy, and resigned to his physical afflictions. Dickinson College awarded him the degree of D.D. in 1792.

== Death and legacy ==
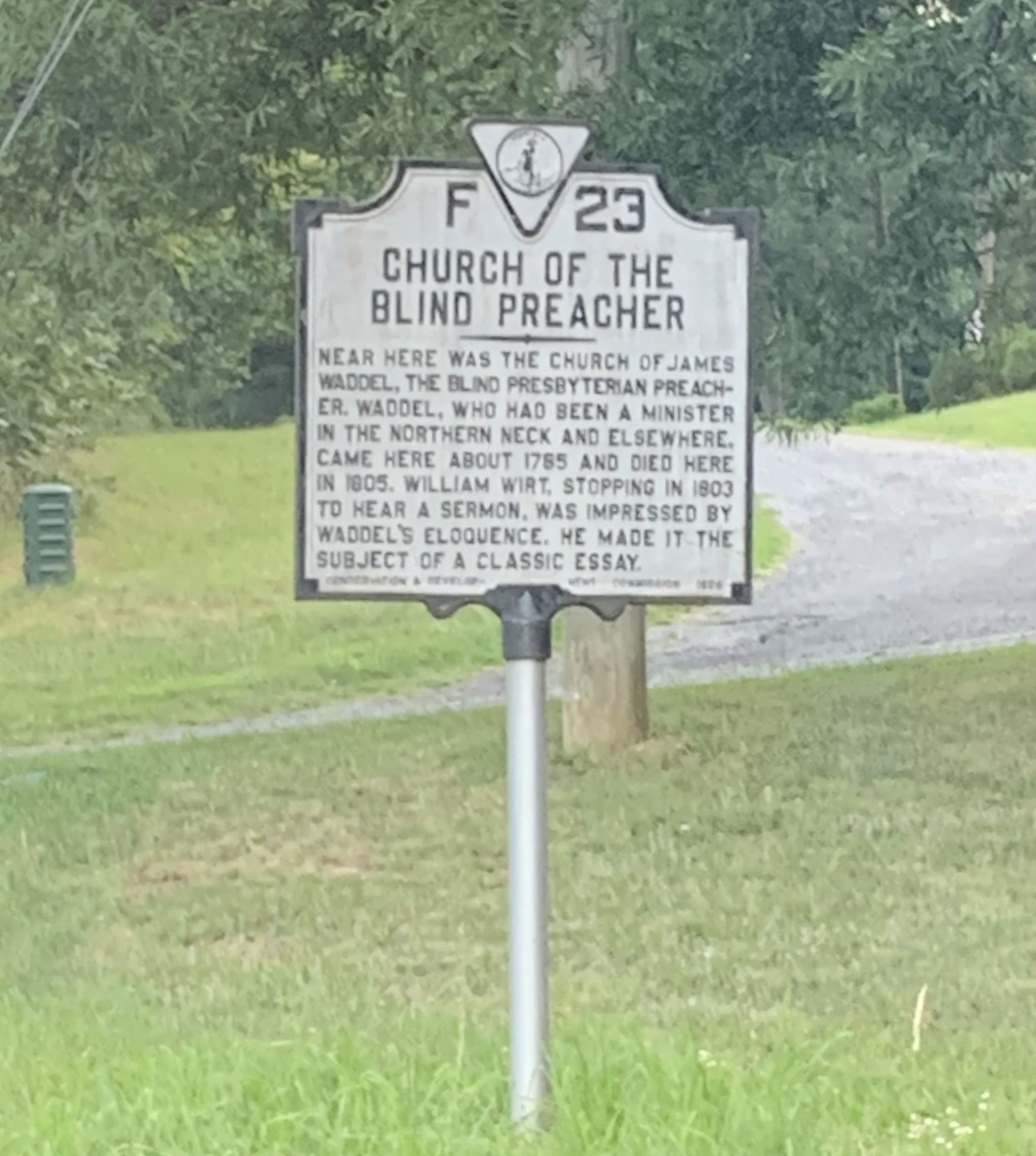
"Church of the Blind Preacher" Historical Highway Marker (F-23) in Orange County, VA.

Waddel died at "Hopewell", his Louisa County estate near Gordonsville, Virginia, on September 17, 1805, survived by his wife Mary and seven children. His last words were: "Let me die, take the pillow from beneath my head. Lord Jesus, receive my spirit."

Before his death Waddel ordered all his manuscripts burned, so his eloquence has become a matter of tradition. William Wirt's fictional Letters of a British Spy (1803), may have used Dr. Waddel (then old and infirm) as a character. While questioning the level of artistic license therein, Dr. Waddel's biographer gives a qualified description as follows:

"Mr. Wirt stated to me that, so far from adding colors to the picture of Dr. Waddel's eloquence, he had fallen below the truth. In person he was tall and erect, his mien was unusually dignified, and his manners graceful and eloquent. Under his preaching, audiences were irresistibly and simultaneously moved, like the wind-shaken forest."

— James Waddel Alexander, Memoir of the Rev. James Waddel, D.D.

In 1871 his body was moved to the yard of the Waddell Memorial Presbyterian Church at Rapidan, Culpeper County, Virginia. His daughter, Janetta Waddel, married the Reverend Archibald Alexander in 1802. His grandson, James Waddel Alexander, wrote a memoir of his grandfather originally published in the Watchman of the South (1846).

== Family ==
James Waddell and Mary Gordon had ten children:

1. Nathaniel Waddell. Married his cousin Mary Smith Gordon.
2. James Gordon Waddell (1770-1857). Married (1) his cousin Lucy Gordon. Married (2) Mildred Thornton Lindsay.
3. Elizabeth Waddell (1777-1851). Married Rev. William Calhoun.
4. Isaac Waddell (1780-18??). Moved to South Carolina where he settled on the banks of the Tyger River in Greenville District. Married, about 1805, Nancy Middleton and had several children. One daughter married ____ Goodlet. Another daughter, Martha, married William Hubbard, a hotel proprietor of Anderson, South Carolina.
5. Janetta Waddell (1782-1852). Married Archibald Alexander. Their issue included James Waddel Alexander, William Cowper Alexander, and Joseph Addison Alexander. Another son, Henry Martyn Alexander, was the grandfather of Eleanor Butler Alexander-Roosevelt, wife of Theodore Roosevelt Jr.
6. Anne Harrison Waddell (1783-1853).
7. Dr. Addison W. Waddell (1785-1855). Married (1) Catherine Ann Boys and (2) Mrs. Ann Douglas. He and his first wife were the parents of writer and historian Joseph Addison Waddell.
8. Sarah Waddell (1789-1865)
9. Lyttleton Waddell (1790-1869). Married Elizabeth Edmonson.
10. Harrington Waddell. Died young.

Tyler, in Men of mark in Virginia, omits Isaac and adds a daughter named Mary.
