= Thomas Lewis (Virginia politician) =

American politician

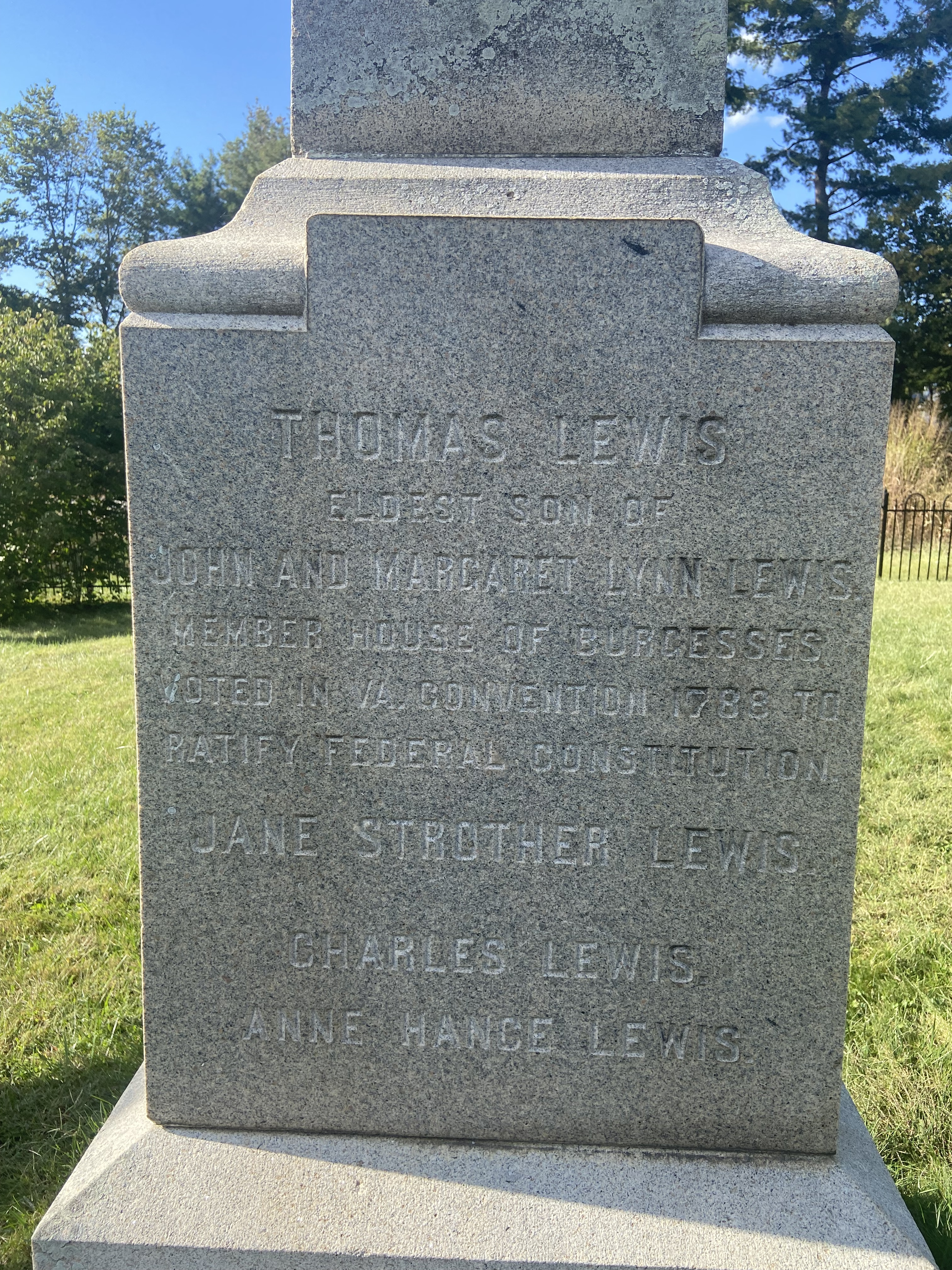
- Headstone of Thomas Lewis at the Lewis Family Cemetery in Rockingham County, Virginia

Member of the Virginia House of Delegates from Augusta County
- In office October 7, 1776 – December 21, 1776 Serving with Samuel McDowell
- Succeeded by: John Pogue

Member of the 2nd, 3rd, 4th and 5th Virginia Revolutionary Councils from Augusta
- In office March 1775 – July 6, 1776 Serving with Samuel McDowell

Personal details
- Born: April 27, 1718 County Donegal, Ireland
- Died: January 31, 1790 (aged 71) Lynnwood, Rockingham County, Virginia
- Resting place: Lewis Family Cemetery, Lynnwood, Rockingham County, Virginia
- Spouse: Jane Strother
- Children: Thomas Lewis, Jr.

Thomas Lewis (April 27, 1718 – January 31, 1790) was an Irish-American surveyor, lawyer, politician and pioneer of early western Virginia. He represented Augusta County at four of the five Virginia Revolutionary Conventions and the first session of the Virginia House of Delegates during the American War for Independence, and after the conflict, represented newly established Rockingham County at the Virginia Ratification Convention, as well as contributed to the settlement of Kanawha County that, long after his death, became part of West Virginia.

== Early life ==
Lewis was born to Colonel John Lewis (1678–1762) and Margaret Lynn Lewis (1693–1773) in County Donegal, Ireland on April 27, 1718. Needing to leave Ireland after killing his landlord, John Lewis immigrated to Philadelphia in 1728; and two years later brought over his family, including Thomas and his brothers Andrew and William. In the summer of 1732 the Lewis family moved to the western frontier, following the Shenandoah River south into Virginia, and finally settled near the headwaters of the south fork in what was then vast Spotsylvania County. The family established a farm and built "Fort Lewis," a stockade fort, for defense against Native American raids.

The Crown in 1736 granted Robert Beverley's son, Col. William Beverley, a wealthy planter and merchant from Essex County in the Virginia colony, 118,491 acres (478 km^{2}) in what would become Augusta County. This effectively made the Lewis family squatters on Beverley's new land grant. John Lewis corrected this in 1739 by purchasing 2,071 acres (8 km^{2}) along Lewis Creek (about a mile (2 km) east of what is now Staunton, Virginia) from Beverley. He named his new home "Bellefonte".

Thomas Lewis was considered an ardent student as a young man, partly because he was very nearsighted. Later, he learned surveying and read law. As early as 1739 he began acquiring land of his own to the south and west of Beverley's Manor in what is today Rockingham and Bath counties.

Lewis married Jane Strother (from an established family in Stafford County) on January 26, 1749, and moved north to what would later become Rockingham County. The couple built a plantation they called "Lynnwood" near Port Republic and the confluence of the North and South Rivers, forming the South Fork of the Shenandoah River. They raised thirteen children. One son, Thomas Lewis, Jr., served in the U.S. Congress as well as the Virginia House of Delegates.

== Career ==
The House of Burgesses had authorized creation of still-vast Augusta County in 1738, but seven years passed before European settlement had grown enough to justify organizing the county's government. Thomas Lewis became one of the first county judges (commissioners) in 1745. Shortly afterward, in 1746, Lewis and Peter Jefferson surveyed part of the boundaries of Lord Fairfax's 5,282,000 acre (61,000 km^{2}) land grant (see the Fairfax Line). Lewis kept detailed journals of several surveying expeditions, which provide a historical view of early western Virginia. In 1746 he laid out the first Staunton town plat for what was originally called Beverley's Mill Place.

Lewis held a number of local offices, and was surveyor of Augusta County for many years beginning in 1746. He also became a founding trustee of Liberty Hall, formerly the Augusta Academy, which in 1776 was renamed in a burst of revolutionary fervor and relocated to Lexington, Virginia. Other founding trustees included his brother Andrew Lewis, Samuel McDowell, Sampson Mathews, George Moffett, William Preston, and James Waddel. Finally receiving a state charter in 1782, Liberty Hall would be renamed again, to Washington College and eventually became Washington and Lee University. It is now the country's ninth oldest institution of higher education.

In the early days of the American Revolution, following unrest over new taxes imposed by Britain to fund the French and Indian War and Lord Dunmore's War, Virginia governor Lord Dunmore suppressed the House of Burgesses in which Lewis's younger brother Andrew Lewis represented Botetourt County (established in 1772 and which lay south of Augusta County). Augusta County voters elected Thomas Lewis and Samuel McDowell to four of the five Virginia Revolutionary Conventions that replaced the Burgesses. When the new state government was created in 1776, Lewis was elected to the state's first House of Delegates.

In 1778, the year the Virginia General Assembly split Augusta County in order to create Rockingham County, Thomas Lewis journeyed even further along the Ohio River to Pittsburgh. He was among the men who negotiated the controversial Treaty of Fort Pitt (1778) with the Delaware Indians, guaranteeing their neutrality for the rest of the war. He was one of the Virginia commissioners appointed to negotiate a resolution in 1779 with Pennsylvania over the two states' western-border dispute.

In 1788, Lewis became one of the delegates for Rockingham County, along with his brother-in-law Gabriel Jones, to the Virginia convention which ultimately ratified the U.S. Constitution. When the Virginia General Assembly authorized establishment of Kanawha County and established a court to administer the county, Lewis became one of the court's twelve members; the court met for the first time on October 5, 1789, at the house of George Clendenin in Charleston.

== Death and legacy ==
Lewis died at Lynnwood in 1790, by which time his son Thomas Lewis Jr. had begun serving part time as one of Kanawha County's representatives in the Virginia House of Delegates, and would later briefly serve in the U.S. House of Representatives. Thomas Lewis Sr. is buried beside his wife Jane in the Lewis Family burial ground in Lynnwood, Rockingham County, Virginia. On December 19, 1794, the Virginia General Assembly passed an act which established the town of Point Pleasant on Lewis' property at the mouth of the Kanawha River (in present-day Mason County, West Virginia). His journal of his 1746 surveying journey was printed in 1925.

== See also ==
- Allegheny Mountains
