= Fort Lewis =

Fort Lewis may refer to:

- Fort Lewis (Colorado), a former United States Army post (1878–1891) in the U.S. State of Colorado
  - Fort Lewis College, a college in the Durango, Colorado, United States
  - Fort Lewis Skyhawks, athletic teams of Fort Lewis College
- Fort Lewis (Washington), a United States Army post (1917–Present) in the U.S. State of Washington
  - Fort Lewis Internment Camp, a former internment camp (1942–1943) at Fort Lewis, Washington
  - Fort Lewis Six, a 1970 event at Fort Lewis, Washington
  - Joint Base Lewis–McChord, a joint military base into which Fort Lewis, Washington, was consolidated
  - Lewis Army Museum, a United States Army museum at Joint Base Lewis–McChord
- Fort Lewis, Virginia, an historical site in Bath County, Virginia, United States
- Fort Lewis Mountain, a mountain in Roanoke County, Virginia, United States
