= Archibald Wager =

18th-century civil servant in colonial Virginia

Clerk of Court for Hampshire County
- In office 1755–1757
- Preceded by: None
- Succeeded by: Gabriel Jones

Clerk of Court for Brunswick County
- In office 1757–1760
- Preceded by: Littleton Tazewell
- Succeeded by: John Robinson

Clerk of Court for Frederick County
- In office 1760–1762
- Preceded by: James Wood
- Succeeded by: James Keith

Personal details
- Occupation: Clerk of Court; planter

Archibald Wager was an 18th-century civil servant in colonial Virginia. Wager served as the Clerk of Court for three counties: Hampshire County (1755–1757), Brunswick County (1757–1760), and Frederick County (1760–1762). Following his service as a Clerk of Court, Wager managed the construction of public roads in Frederick County in 1763.

== Political career ==
Following the creation of Hampshire County in 1754, Archibald Wager was appointed to serve as the county's inaugural Clerk of Court in 1755 according to records of the court from June 11 of that year. While Wager was mentioned as the first Clerk of Court, it is unknown where the first county court was held; however, it is known that Thomas Bryan Martin, nephew of Thomas Fairfax, 6th Lord Fairfax of Cameron, was the county's first appointed justice. Under the act establishing Hampshire County, the county's court was to be held in June 1754; however, it was not until 1757 that formal record keeping was actualized in Hampshire County, due in part to the ongoing French and Indian War and repeated Native American attacks. Throughout Wager's tenure in the position, Hampshire County suffered the worst of its incursions by Native Americans, which caused many settlers to flee their homes and settlements. In 1757, Gabriel Jones was appointed to replace Wager as the county's Clerk of Court. Even though Wager was likely the first appointed Clerk of Court for Hampshire County, his successor Jones was the first operational appointee to serve in the position. (Note: Noted Hampshire County historian Wilmer L. Kerns in Hampshire County, West Virginia, 1754–2004 (2004) contends that Gabriel Jones was in fact the first Clerk of Court for Hampshire County, as there was no record keeping in the county until the start of Jones's tenure as Clerk of Court in 1757.) (Note: West Virginia historians Hu Maxwell and Howard Llewellyn Swisher aver in their History of Hampshire County, West Virginia: From Its Earliest Settlement to the Present (1897) that Archibald Wager was the inaugural Clerk of Court for Hampshire County, serving from 1755 to 1757. Maxwell and Swisher asserted the following: "The honor of being the first clerk of Hampshire has usually been given to Gabriel Jones; but this is also a mistake, and it was made in the same manner as the error as to the first court. The first page of the oldest book was examined, and the clerk who recorded that page was Gabriel Jones. But the records of the court of June 11, 1755 show that Archibald Wager was the first clerk, or at least was in office before Gabriel Jones. There is nothing in this old book to show where this first court was held.")

Wager was next commissioned to serve as the fourth Clerk of Court for Brunswick County by Deputy Secretary of Virginia Thomas Nelson, thus replacing Littleton Tazewell, father of United States Senator Henry Tazewell. Wager's commission to the post was qualified on April 26, 1757 and he remained in that position for three years until February 5, 1760. Wager was replaced in his position by John Robinson.

Subsequent to the death of the Frederick County Clerk of Court, Col. James Wood during the winter of 1759–60, Wager was appointed his replacement by Deputy Secretary Nelson, acting as governor, at the county court held February 5, 1760. Col. Wood's nineteen-year-old son James Wood, later a Governor of Virginia, was appointed to serve as Wager's deputy clerk on May 7, 1760. During his tenure, the Frederick County Court was steadily called upon for assistance in building forts and stockades to protect outlying settlements against further Native American attacks. Wager served as the Clerk of Court for about two years until May 4, 1762, when he was succeeded by James Keith, who was duly sworn and qualified after he produced a commission granted to him by Virginia Secretary Nelson. The reasons for Wager's termination from the position are not known.

External image
- "Statement signed by Arch. Wager" (December 7, 1763) from Marietta College Special Collections

Following his service as Clerk of Court, Wager managed the construction of county roads with public monies. On November 3, 1762, the Frederick County Court chose Wager as the "appointed overseer" of the road between Stephensburg (present-day Stephens City) and the "Nations" plantation of Lord Fairfax and supervised the road's construction by tithables (workers paid with public tax monies) under his charge.

== Personal life ==
In 1761, Wager produced 200 pounds of tobacco, which was received and certified by Secretary Nelson and Wager's Deputy Clerk of Court Wood on January 2, 1762.

Wager was a practicing Anglican. According to Frederick County Parish records, Wager's signature was listed among those who participated in the Eucharist between 1761 and 1763.

== Bibliography ==
- Brannon, Selden W., ed. (1976). Historic Hampshire: A Symposium of Hampshire County and Its People, Past and Present. Parsons, West Virginia: McClain Printing Company. ISBN 978-0-87012-236-1. OCLC 3121468.
- Cartmell, Thomas Kemp (1909). Shenandoah Valley Pioneers and Their Descendants: A History of Frederick County, Virginia (illustrated) from Its Formation in 1738 to 1908. Winchester, Virginia: Eddy Press Corporation. ISBN 9780722246306. OCLC 583806244 – via Google Books.
- Greene, Katherine Glass (2009). Winchester, Virginia and Its Beginnings, 1743-1814. Bowie, Maryland: Heritage Books. ISBN 978-0-7884-2062-7. OCLC 49760968 – via Google Books.
- Johnston, Frederick (1888). Memorials of Old Virginia Clerks: Arranged Alphabetically by Counties, with Complete Index of Names, and Dates of Service from 1634 to the Present Time. Lynchburg, Virginia: J. P. Bell Company, Printers. OCLC 210738128 – via Google Books.
- Kerns, Wilmer L. (1995). Frederick County, Virginia: Settlement and Some First Families of Back Creek Valley, 1730–1830. Gateway Press, Incorporated – via Google Books.
- Luckman, Gene; Miller, Ann Brush (June 2005). Frederick County Road Orders 1743-1772 (PDF). Richmond, Virginia: Virginia Department of Transportation.
- Maxwell, Hu; Swisher, Howard Llewellyn (1897). History of Hampshire County, West Virginia From Its Earliest Settlement to the Present. Morgantown, West Virginia: A. Brown Boughner, Printer. OCLC 680931891. OL 23304577M.
- Morton, Oren Frederic (1925). The Story of Winchester in Virginia: The Oldest Town in the Shenandoah Valley. Strasburg, Virginia: Shenandoah Publishing House. OCLC 2173884 – via Google Books.
- Munske, Roberta R.; Kerns, Wilmer L. (2004). Hampshire County, West Virginia, 1754–2004. The Hampshire County 250th Anniversary Committee. ISBN 978-0-9715738-2-6. OCLC 55983178.
- Norris, J. E., ed. (1890). History of the Lower Shenandoah Valley Counties of Frederick, Berkeley, Jefferson and Clarke. Chicago: A. Warner & Company. OCLC 181016569 – via Internet Archive.

Court offices
Preceded by None	Clerk of Court for Hampshire County; 1755–1757	Succeeded by Gabriel Jones
Preceded by Littleton Tazewell	Clerk of Court for Brunswick County; 1757–1760	Succeeded by John Robinson
Preceded by James Wood	Clerk of Court for Frederick County; 1760–1762	Succeeded by James Keith
