= Gabriel Jones (politician) =

American lawyer and legislator (1724–1806)

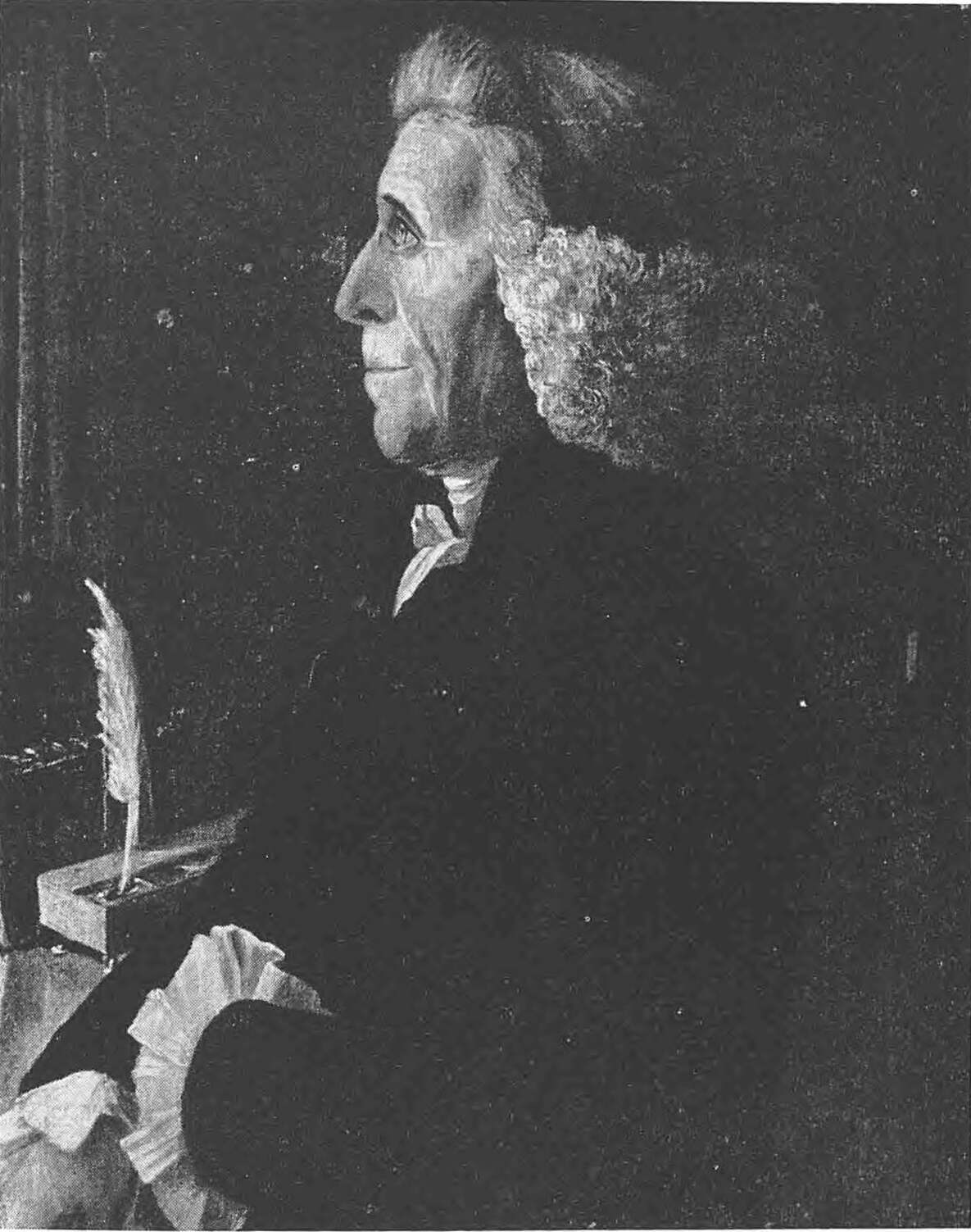

Member of the House of Burgesses from Frederick County
- In office 1748–1754 Serving with George Fairfax; George William Fairfax
- Preceded by: Samuel Earle; Andrew Campbell
- Succeeded by: Isaac Parkins

Member of the House of Burgesses from Hampshire County
- In office 1754–1755 Serving with Mr. Parker
- Preceded by: Position established
- Succeeded by: Thomas Bryan Martin; Thomas Walker
- In office 1758–1761 Serving with Thomas Walker
- Preceded by: Thomas Bryan Martin
- Succeeded by: James Keith; James Mercer

Member of the House of Burgesses from Augusta County
- In office 1757–1758 Serving with John Willson
- Preceded by: John Madison
- Succeeded by: Israel Christian
- In office 1771–1771 Serving with John Willson
- Preceded by: William Preston
- Succeeded by: Samuel McDowell

King's Attorney for Augusta County
- In office 1746–1748

Clerk of Court for Hampshire County
- In office 1757–1782
- Preceded by: Archibald Wager
- Succeeded by: Andrew Wodrow

Personal details
- Born: May 17, 1724 near Williamsburg, York County, Colony of Virginia
- Died: October 1806 (aged 82) "Bogota," Port Republic, Rockingham County, Virginia, United States
- Spouse: Margaret Strother Morton
- Relations: John Jones (father); Elizabeth Jones (mother); John Gabriel Jones (nephew); Thomas Lewis Jr. (nephew); Thomas Lewis (brother-in-law); John Harvie (son-in-law)
- Children: Margaret Morton Jones Harvie; Elizabeth Jones Lewis; Anna Gabriella Jones Hawkins; William Strother Jones
- Education: Christ's Hospital
- Occupation: lawyer; politician; civil servant; court clerk

Gabriel Jones (May 17, 1724 – October 1806) was an 18th-century Welsh American lawyer, legislator, court clerk and civil servant in the colony (and later U.S. state) of Virginia.

Jones attended Christ's Hospital (one of England's "Bluecoat Schools"), after which he served as an indentured apprentice studying jurisprudence under a solicitor in the Court of Chancery and of Lyon's Inn in Middlesex. At the age of 21, Jones was admitted to practice law following the completion of his apprenticeship. He was persuaded by either Thomas Fairfax, 6th Lord Fairfax of Cameron, the landowner of the Northern Neck Proprietary, or his relative Hugh Mercer to return to Virginia, where he engaged in the practice of law.

Jones served as Clerk of Court for Hampshire County, Virginia (now West Virginia) for a tenure lasting 25 years (1757–1782) and represented Frederick, Hampshire, and Augusta counties as a member of the House of Burgesses of Virginia. In addition, Jones also served as the King's Attorney for Augusta County and as the coroner for Frederick County. He was elected to represent Virginia at the Continental Congress but did not attend, and was elected to represent Rockingham County in the Virginia Ratifying Convention. Jones was an uncle of American pioneer John Gabriel Jones (1752–1776), and he was a friend of both George Washington and Thomas Fairfax, 6th Lord Fairfax of Cameron.

== Early life and education ==
Coat of Arms of Gabriel Jones

Gabriel Jones was born on May 17, 1724, approximately 3 miles (4.8 km) from Williamsburg, in York County, Colony of Virginia. He was a son of John and Elizabeth Jones, who had arrived in Virginia several years earlier from Montgomeryshire in northern Wales, Great Britain, where Jones's family was of noble descent. Jones's father was a weaver. Jones's elder sister Elizabeth was born on August 13, 1721, at the College of William & Mary in Williamsburg, and his younger brother John was born on June 12, 1725, at the same location as Jones.

According to Jones family tradition, Jones's father lost a significant amount of his wealth while in Virginia, which brought about his family's return to England in 1727. Jones's father's death prior to 1727 also precipitated the family's move, and following their relocation to England, Elizabeth raised Jones and his siblings in London where she had Jones's sister baptized at St Giles in the Fields on February 20, 1727.

In April 1732, Jones was granted admission to Christ's Hospital (one of England's "Bluecoat Schools") in London following his presentation by Thomas Sandford. Jones attended Christ's Hospital for seven years. On April 12, 1739, he was discharged from the institution by his mother and John Houghton, a solicitor in the Court of Chancery and of Lyon's Inn in Middlesex. Despite its noble origins, Jones's family was of limited means, (Note: Waddell 1886, p. 392. In Joseph Addison Waddell's Annals of Augusta County, Virginia, With Reminiscences Illustrative of the Vicissitudes of Its Pioneer Settlers (1886), Waddell states that a descendant of Jones had in their possession an old coin and on its paper wrapping was a note written by Jones: "This is the patrimony I received from my mother. From my father I received nothing.") and he served as an indentured apprentice studying jurisprudence under Houghton's charge for a term of six years until 1745. At the age of 21, Jones was admitted to practice law following the completion of his apprenticeship.

== Political career ==
=== Return to Virginia ===
Following his admission to the bar and the death of his mother in 1745, Jones was persuaded by either Thomas Fairfax, 6th Lord Fairfax of Cameron, the landowner of the Northern Neck Proprietary, or his relative Hugh Mercer to return to Virginia. Once he was "free of his indentures" and had "attained his majority", Jones secured his return to Virginia. He settled first in Fredericksburg and later relocated to Frederick County, after which on March 1, 1747, he acquired a tract of land along Opequon Creek near present-day Kernstown, where he resided for several years. Upon settling in Frederick County, Jones became the private secretary to Lord Fairfax.

=== House of Burgesses tenures ===
Jones was appointed to serve as the first King's Attorney for Augusta County around April 1746, at the age of 22. The county's court recommended Jones to the position, citing him "as a fit person to transact His Majesty's affairs in this county". Jones continued to reside in Frederick County while performing the duties of King's Attorney in Augusta County. When the first appointed justices of Augusta County assembled on December 9, 1745, the body qualified Jones to practice as an "attorney-at-law" in the county. He was the first lawyer to reside within the then-boundaries of Augusta County. Jones served in that position for two years until his election to represent Frederick County as a member of the House of Burgesses of Virginia in 1748, and he was subsequently re-elected to his seat for the 1749 legislative session. From 1748 to 1750, Jones represented Frederick County alongside George Fairfax.

Jones was again elected to represent Frederick County in the House of Burgesses in 1752, but resigned in 1753 to serve as the county's coroner. From 1752 until 1754, Jones represented Frederick County alongside George William Fairfax. In 1753, Jones relocated from Kernstown in Frederick County to his estate "Bogota" in Augusta County (present-day Rockingham County near the modern unincorporated community of Port Republic). From 1754 to 1755, Jones served alongside a Mr. Parker representing Hampshire County in the House of Burgesses. Jones and Parker were Hampshire County's first representatives in the House of Burgesses following the county's creation on May 1, 1754. Jones, along with Lord Fairfax, was appointed as a trustee for the towns of Winchester and Stephensburg (present-day Stephens City) charged with laying out the towns and establishing regulations for the construction of residences in each town.

=== Hampshire County Clerk of Court tenure ===
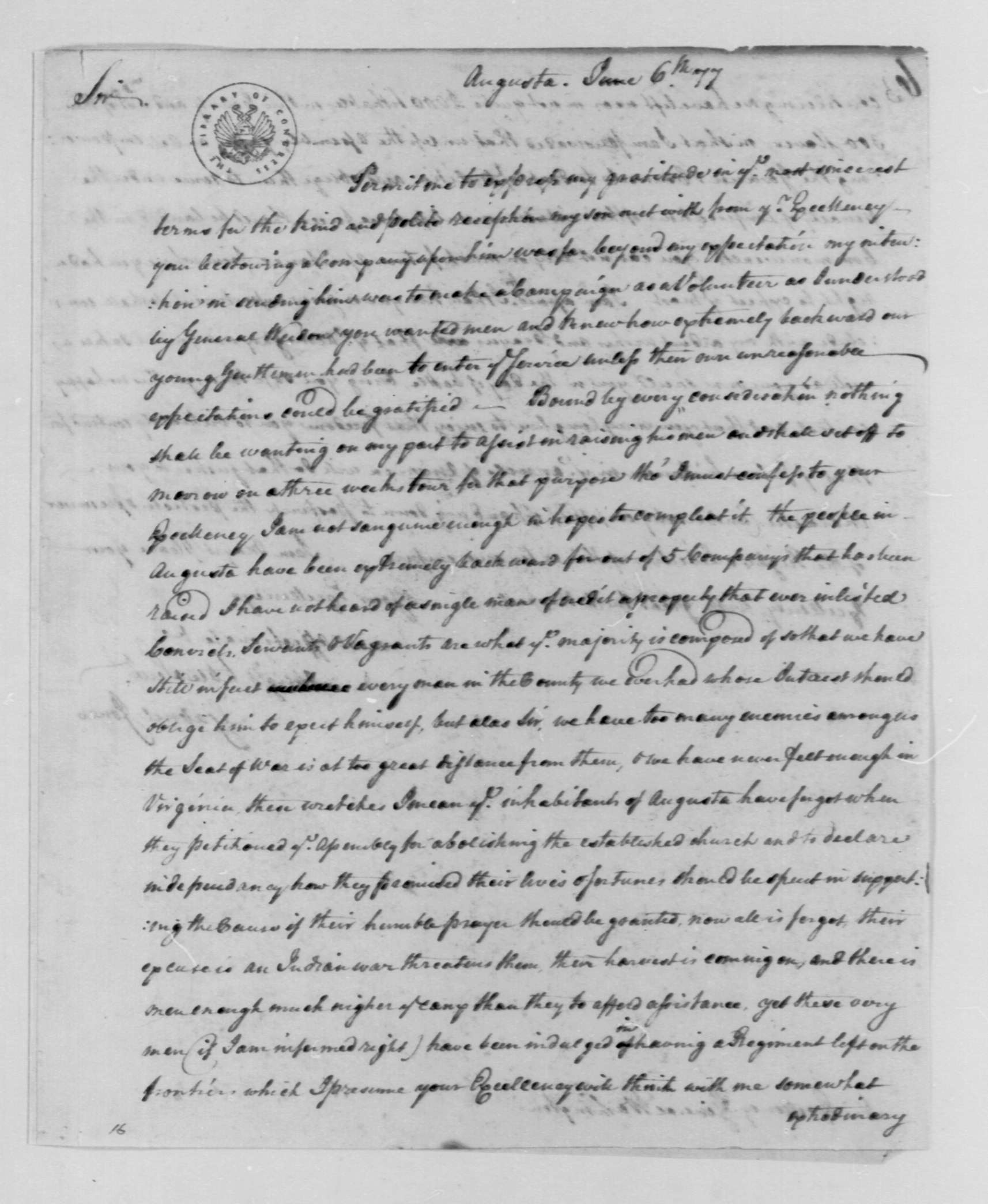
Jones maintained correspondences with George Washington, as evidenced in this June 6, 1777 letter written by Jones to Washington.

In 1757, Jones was appointed by Thomas Fairfax, 6th Lord Fairfax of Cameron, to serve as Clerk of Court for Hampshire County. Jones was on close terms with Lord Fairfax, and George Rockingham Gilmer described Jones as a "kinsman, friend and executor of Lord Fairfax". Despite the county's establishment in 1754, it was not until 1757 that formal record-keeping was actualized in Hampshire County, due in part to the French and Indian War. While Archibald Wager was likely the first appointed Clerk of Court for Hampshire County, Jones was the first operational appointee to serve in the position. (Note: Munske & Kerns 2004, p. 39. Noted Hampshire County historian Wilmer L. Kerns in Hampshire County, West Virginia, 1754–2004 (2004) contends that Jones was in fact the first Clerk of Court for Hampshire County, as there was no record keeping in the county until the start of Jones's tenure as Clerk of Court in 1757.) (Note: Maxwell & Swisher 1897, p. 362. West Virginia historians Hu Maxwell and Howard Llewellyn Swisher state in their History of Hampshire County, West Virginia: From Its Earliest Settlement to the Present (1897) that Archibald Wager was the inaugural Clerk of Court for Hampshire County, serving from 1755 to 1757. Maxwell and Swisher asserted the following: "The honor of being the first clerk of Hampshire has usually been given to Gabriel Jones; but this is also a mistake, and it was made in the same manner as the error as to the first court. The first page of the oldest book was examined, and the clerk who recorded that page was Gabriel Jones. But the records of the court of June 11, 1755 show that Archibald Wager was the first clerk, or at least was in office before Gabriel Jones. There is nothing in this old book to show where this first court was held.") According to historian Wilmer L. Kerns in Hampshire County, West Virginia, 1754–2004 (2004), Jones was "well-organized" and had the "best penmanship of any clerk in the history of the county, in spite of being totally blind in his right eye". Historians Hu Maxwell and Howard Llewellyn Swisher described Jones's handwriting as "unmistakable" in their History of Hampshire County, West Virginia (1897).

Around 1760, Jones hired Samuel Dew of Richmond County to serve as his deputy clerk. Dew apprenticed under Jones for 21 years, occasionally performing duties as acting clerk. Due to his close relationship with Lord Fairfax, it is likely that Jones was Clerk of Court of neighboring counties also under the ownership of Lord Fairfax's Northern Neck Proprietary. According to Maxwell and Swisher, Jones relied upon his deputy clerks, such as Dew, to transcribe and document court proceedings, which Jones traveled among the various counties to sign.

While serving as Clerk of Court, Jones was again elected to serve as a member of the House of Burgesses representing Augusta County from 1757 until 1758 and Hampshire County from 1758 until 1761. It was during this period that Jones formed a close relationship with George Washington, and the two regularly corresponded. Jones was elected to serve a final term in the House of Burgesses representing Augusta County in 1771. In 1774, Jones was elected to represent Virginia in the Continental Congress but did not attend. When Jones's Bogota estate became part of the newly minted Rockingham County following its creation from Augusta County in 1778, Jones thus became a citizen of Rockingham and was summarily appointed as its Deputy Commonwealth's Attorney. Jones was also commissioned to ascertain the "pay and subsistence" of the Virginia militia and damages caused by Cherokee and Catawba Native American tribes throughout the Virginia frontier. In addition, Jones was appointed, along with Samuel Washington and George Read, by the Continental Congress and Virginia to travel to Fort Pitt, Pennsylvania, to inquire about "the condition of affairs there" in 1777. Following the death of Lord Fairfax in 1781, Jones was one of the executors of Lord Fairfax's will.

Jones served as Clerk of Court for Hampshire County for a tenure spanning 25 years until his retirement from the position in 1782. In their History of Hampshire County, West Virginia (1897), Maxwell and Swisher theorize that Jones retired from his position due in part to Lord Fairfax's death the previous year and waning British influence in Virginia toward the conclusion of the American Revolutionary War.

== Later life and legacy ==
Following his retirement from his position as Clerk of Court for Hampshire County, Jones continued to remain active in Virginia political affairs. On October 1, 1784, George Washington visited and dined with Jones at his home at Bogota. In 1788, Jones and his brother-in-law Thomas Lewis were elected to represent Rockingham County at the Virginia Ratifying Convention, where both were fervent proponents for the adoption of the United States Constitution. (Note: Waddell 1886, p. 393. In Waddell's Annals of Augusta County, Virginia, With Reminiscences Illustrative of the Vicissitudes of Its Pioneer Settlers (1886), Waddell remarks of Lewis and Jones prior to their election to represent Rockingham County in the Virginia Ratifying Convention: "Mr. Lewis was a popular man while Mr. Jones was not, and it is related that in a public speech before the election, the latter declined the support of 'the rascals' who, he understood, proposed to vote for him because of his association with the former.") Archibald Stuart of neighboring Augusta County traveled to Rockingham to canvass for Jones prior to the election, and in return, Jones gifted Stuart a chaise to enable Stuart and his wife to return home to Augusta County. Jones was among the first trustees of the Staunton Academy, following its incorporation by an act of the Virginia General Assembly on December 4, 1792.

Jones continued to practice law in Rockingham County until his death. The road upon which he regularly traveled between his residence Bogota and Rockingham County's seat of Harrisonburg became known as "The Lawyer's Road", which evolved to its present name of "Lawyer Road". Because of his prominence throughout the Valley of Virginia region, and possibly also due to the fact he may have been the first lawyer in Augusta County, Jones was nicknamed "The Valley Lawyer". Jones died at his estate Bogota in October 1806.

In the spring of 1887, a memorial window to Jones and his wife was installed in a new Episcopal church erected near their former Bogota residence. Jones was further memorialized in historian Joseph Addison Waddell's Annals of Augusta County, Virginia (1886), in which Waddell remarked of Jones: "He was considered a man of great ability and unbending integrity. His only fault, or the only one which tradition tells of, was an extremely irritable temper, which, when aroused, expressed itself in the strongest terms he could command, mingled with no little profanity. Having a scorn of all dishonesty and meanness, he did not spare a miscreant by tongue or pen." In his Historic Families of Kentucky (1889), historian and genealogist Thomas Marshall Green said of Jones: "Gabriel Jones rose rapidly in his profession; in attainments he was second to no man at the colonial bar; in native ability he was conspicuous among those who stood in the first rank."

== Personal life ==
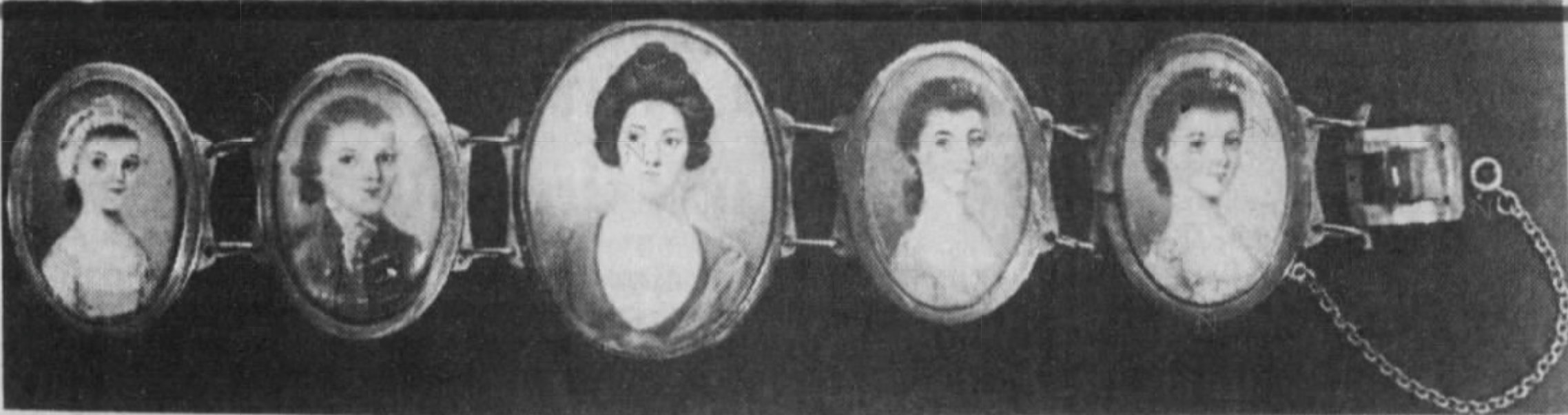
Margaret Strother Morton Jones bracelet - miniature portraits of Margaret and four children, including Margaret Morton Jones who married John Harvie.

Jones was married on October 16, 1749, to Margaret Strother Morton (1726–1822), the widow of George Morton and the daughter of William Strother and his wife Margaret Watts of King George County. Jones's wife lived to be 97, and was described by Waddell in his Annals of Augusta County, Virginia as "a lady of eminent Christian character". Jones and his wife Margaret had three daughters, one son, and a child of unknown sex that died in infancy: Margaret Morton Jones Harvie, married to lawyer Colonel John Harvie of Albemarle County; Elizabeth Jones Lewis, married to merchant John Lewis of Fredericksburg (son of Fielding Lewis and his first wife Catharine Washington); Anna Gabriella Jones Hawkins, married to John Hawkins of Kentucky; and William Strother Jones (born March 21, 1756), married to Fanny Thornton of Fredericksburg.

Jones was an Anglican. As early as 1750, Jones used the same family crest and coat of arms as philologist Sir William Jones, indicating a possible familial relationship between the two. Physically, Jones was of short stature, and according to an extant contemporary portrait of him by artist John Drinker, Jones sported a wig and an eyepatch over his right eye. According to Jones's descendants, it was supposed that his right eye was injured in his earlier years while others attributed the loss of his right eye to an accident during his later years. Jones was completely blind in his right eye, and had likely suffered his injury prior to his tenure as Clerk of Court for Hampshire County in 1757. Philip Doddridge described Jones as wearing a bicorne hat, "frilled shirt bosom", and waistbands. He further described Jones as sporting "powdered hair", a blue coat, a white vest, a cravat, silk stockings, and silver knee and shoe buckles.

In his spare time during and between holding political appointments and serving in elected offices, Jones regularly embarked upon "pleasure trips" to various American cities including Baltimore and Richmond. Another known pastime of Jones's was gaming. According to Maxwell and Swisher in their History of Hampshire County, West Virginia (1897), Jones had been gambling over the course of several days while in Richmond until a final game left him with only one shilling remaining in his pocketbook. Jones was wearing a coat fastened with twelve gold buttons each valued at five dollars, and undeterred after losing his last shilling, he began staking one gold button at a time until he was left with one. Without hesitation, Jones removed his final button and remarked: "Here goes the last button on Gabe's coat." Maxwell and Swisher state that Jones's remark "became a proverb in Hampshire County" and was used when someone had been driven to extremes and utilized what little resources were left at their disposal.

== Landholdings ==
Jones settled in Frederick County and on March 1, 1747, he acquired a tract of land along Opequon Creek near present-day Kernstown, where he resided for several years. On August 8, 1751, Jones acquired from Christopher Francisco of Pennsylvania 244 acres (99 ha; 0.381 sq mi) of land along the northern side of the South Fork Shenandoah River in Augusta County (later Rockingham County) near the present-day unincorporated community of Port Republic.

While still a resident in Frederick County, Jones purchased another 400 acres (160 ha; 0.63 sq mi) on the northern side of the James River in Botetourt County. On December 3, 1753, Jones sold his property near Kernstown in Frederick County and relocated to his tract of land along the Shenandoah River, on which he established his estate later known as Bogota. Jones was the first to settle and construct a residence on his Bogota property upon his arrival in 1753, and the estate received its name under Jones's occupancy. Jones continued to reside at Bogota until his death in 1806.

Following Jones's death in 1806, his widow Margaret Morton Jones continued to reside at Bogota until her own death in 1822. Jaquelin Harvie, the son of Jones's daughter Margaret Jones Harvie and her husband John Harvie, purchased the Bogota estate after the death of Jones's wife, and Harvie subsequently sold the property in 1830 to Jacob Strayer, who built the current house in 1845–1847. The original house erected and occupied by Jones was demolished shortly after the construction of the current house. The site of Jones's house is presently located on property no longer part of the Bogota estate, which was listed on the National Register of Historic Places on March 25, 2009. A log tenant house estimated to have been built during the mid-18th century during the ownership of the Jones family is extant, and remains part of the current Bogota estate, as of 2008.

== Bibliography ==
- Brannon, Selden W., ed. (1976). Historic Hampshire: A Symposium of Hampshire County and Its People, Past and Present. Parsons, West Virginia: McClain Printing Company. ISBN 978-0-87012-236-1. OCLC 3121468.
- Brown, Stuart E. (1965). Virginia Baron: The Story of Thomas, 6th Lord Fairfax. Berryville, Virginia: Chesapeake Book Company. OCLC 699865. Archived from the original on June 28, 2014 – via Google Books.
- Cartmell, Thomas Kemp (1909). Shenandoah Valley Pioneers and Their Descendants: A History of Frederick County, Virginia (illustrated) from Its Formation in 1738 to 1908. Winchester, Virginia: Eddy Press Corporation. ISBN 9780722246306. OCLC 583806244. Archived from the original on April 22, 2016 – via Google Books.
- Green, Thomas Marshall (1889). Historic Families of Kentucky. Cincinnati: Robert Clarke and Company. OCLC 223261777. Archived from the original on October 27, 2013 – via Google Books.
- Lockhart, Arthur William (1918). Gabriel Jones (1724–1806): Sometime a Scholar of Christ's Hospital, and American Citizen and Friend of George Washington. London: School Press. OCLC 19319585. Archived from the original on June 28, 2014 – via Google Books.
- Loth, Calder; Wilson, Joanna (October 2008), National Register of Historic Places - Nomination Form: Bogota (PDF), United States Department of the Interior, National Park Service, Virginia Department of Historic Resources, archived from the original (PDF) on February 7, 2016
- Maxwell, Hu; Swisher, Howard Llewellyn (1897). History of Hampshire County, West Virginia From Its Earliest Settlement to the Present. Morgantown, West Virginia: A. Brown Boughner, Printer. OCLC 680931891. OL 23304577M.
- Munske, Roberta R.; Kerns, Wilmer L., eds. (2004). Hampshire County, West Virginia, 1754–2004. Romney, West Virginia: The Hampshire County 250th Anniversary Committee. ISBN 978-0-9715738-2-6. OCLC 55983178.
- Waddell, Joseph Addison (1886). Annals of Augusta County, Virginia, With Reminiscences Illustrative of the Vicissitudes of Its Pioneer Settlers. Richmond, Virginia: William Ellis Jones, Book and Job Printer. OCLC 2687660. Archived from the original on June 28, 2014 – via Google Books.
- West Virginia Historical Society (1992). Genealogies of West Virginia Families from The West Virginia Historical Magazine Quarterly, 1901–1905. Baltimore: Genealogical Publishing Company, Inc. ISBN 978-0-8063-4692-2. OCLC 25575463. Archived from the original on June 28, 2014 – via Google Books.

Virginia House of Delegates
Preceded by Samuel Earle; Andrew Campbell	Member of the House of Burgesses from Frederick County; 1748–1754; Served alongside: George Fairfax; George William Fairfax	Succeeded by Isaac Parkins
Preceded by Position established	Member of the House of Burgesses from Hampshire County; 1754–1755; Served alongside: Mr. Parker	Succeeded by Thomas Bryan Martin; Thomas Walker
Preceded by Thomas Bryan Martin	Member of the House of Burgesses from Hampshire County; 1758–1761; Served alongside: Thomas Walker	Succeeded by James Keith; James Mercer
Preceded by John Madison	Member of the House of Burgesses from Augusta County; 1757–1758; Served alongside: John Willson	Succeeded by Israel Christian
Preceded by William Preston	Member of the House of Burgesses from Augusta County; 1771–1771; Served alongside: John Willson	Succeeded by Samuel McDowell
Court offices
Preceded by Archibald Wager	Clerk of Court for Hampshire County; 1757 – 1782	Succeeded by Andrew Wodrow
