= John Lewis Peyton =

Confederate State Army official and author (1824–1896)

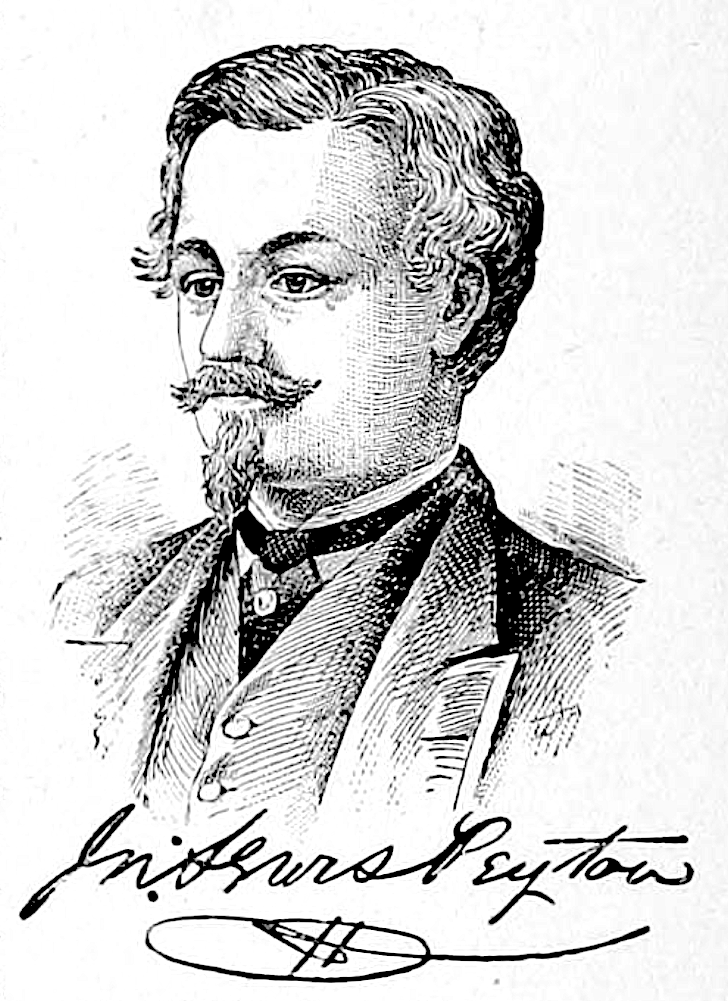
- John Lewis Peyton (1895)
- Born: September 15, 1824 near Staunton, Virginia, U.S.
- Died: May 21, 1896 (aged 71) near Staunton, Virginia, U.S.
- Occupations: Lawyer, diplomat, state agent, author
- Spouse: Henrietta Eliza Clark Washington
- Children: 2

John Lewis Peyton (September 15, 1824 – May 21, 1896) was an American lawyer, diplomat, state agent for the Confederate States Army, and an author from Virginia. During the beginning of the American Civil War he moved to Europe, and in 1861 became a state agent for North Carolina for the southern Confederate States Army cause.

== Early life, family, and education ==
He was born on September 15, 1824, near Staunton, Virginia. His mother was Anne Montgomery Lewis, and his father was John Howe Peyton, a Virginia lawyer, politician, and planter. His great-grandfather was Colonel William Preston, a colonel in the Virginia militia during the American Revolutionary War. His great-great-grandfather was John Lewis, one of the first European settlers in Augusta County.

Peyton studied at Virginia Military Institute (class of 1843); and University of Virginia (bachelor of laws degree 1844). He served as a lieutenant colonel in the Virginia militia.

In 1855, he married North Carolina heiress Henrietta Eliza "Betty" Clark Washington, the daughter of Colonel John C. Washington of Lenoir County, North Carolina. He had a son, Lawrence Washington Howe Peyton; and a daughter, Simone Marie Peyton. They lived on an estate named Steephill (c. 1878) in Staunton.

== Career ==
Peyton practiced law until 1851, when he was sent by the U.S. Secretary of State Daniel Weber on special mission to England, France and Austria for the Millard Fillmore administration.

Starting in 1861, he worked as a Confederate States Army commissioner, seeking support in Europe where he was living. He purchased arms and purchased supplies in England for the North Carolina troops in the Confederate Army. He was a fellow of the British Royal Geographical Society.

Peyton wrote about various historical subjects, including his own travels and his family history. He wrote about his grandfather John Rowzée Peyton. Peyton also propagated misconceptions about the pre-Columbian culture of mound builders. After the war ended, the family remained in England for a while after.

He died of "apoplexy" on May 21, 1896, in Stauton. In 1964, his heir's sold the Steephill family estate to Staunton Military Academy.

== Publications ==
- Peyton, J. Lewis (1867). The Adventures of my Grandfather. With Extracts from His Letters, and Other Family Documents. London: J. Wilson.
- Peyton, J. Lewis (1867). The American Crisis, or, Pages from the Note-book of a State Agent during the Civil War. London: Saunders, Otley and Co.
- Peyton, J. Lewis (1870). Over the Alleghanies and across the Prairies – Personal Recollections of the Far West, One and Twenty Years Ago. London: Simpkin, Marshall, and Co., a memoir
- Peyton, John Lewis; Washington, John; Brown, Orlando (1873). Memoir of William Madison Peyton. John Wilson, Bloomsbury.
- Peyton, J. Lewis (1876). Biographical Sketch of Anne Montgomery Peyton, by her son J.L. Peyton. Guernsey, UK: F. Clark.
- Peyton, J. Lewis (1882). History of Augusta County, Virginia. Staunton, VA: Samuel M. Yost & Son.
- Peyton, J. Lewis (1893). Tom Swindel, or the Adventures of a Boomer. Staunton, VA: G.L. Bolen.
- Peyton, J. Lewis. Memoir of John Howe Peyton, in Sketches by his Contemporaries, Together With Some of his Public and Private Letters, etc., also a sketch of Ann M. Peyton.
