= Andrew Lewis (soldier) =

American surveyor, military officer and politician (1720–1781)

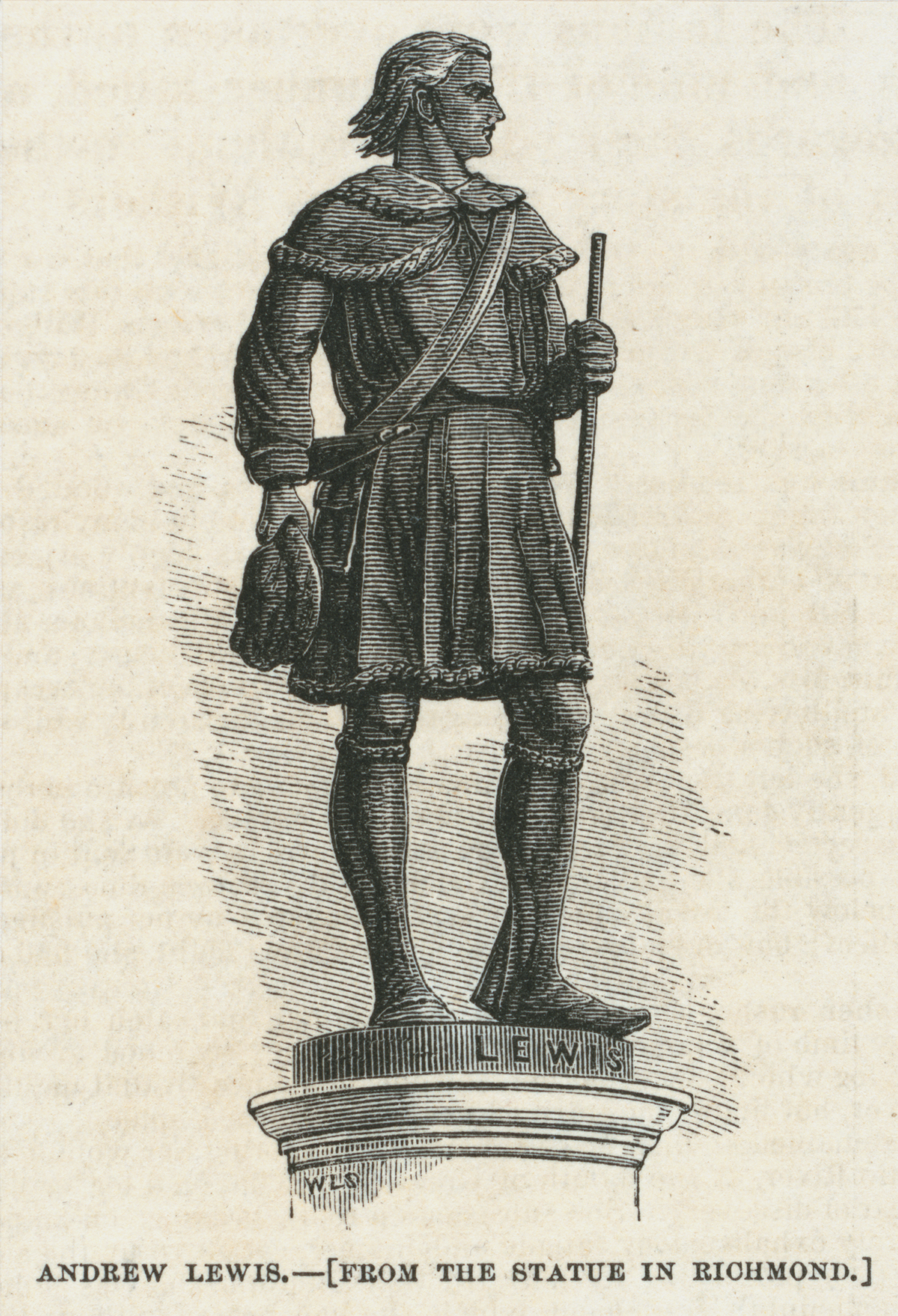
- Lewis (from the statue in Richmond)

Member of the Virginia House of Delegates from Botetourt County
- In office May 1, 1780 – 1780 Serving with John Wood
- Preceded by: William McClanahan
- Succeeded by: Thomas Madison

Member of the House of Burgesses from Botetourt County
- In office 1772–1775 Serving with John Bowyer
- Preceded by: William Preston
- Succeeded by: n/a

Personal details
- Born: October 9, 1720 County Donegal, Ireland
- Died: September 26, 1781 (aged 60) Bedford County, Virginia, U.S.
- Resting place: East Hill Cemetery; Salem, Virginia

Military service
- Allegiance: Great Britain; United States
- Branch: Virginia Militia; Continental Army
- Rank: Brigadier general
- Battles/wars: French and Indian War; Battle of Fort Necessity; Lord Dunmore’s War; American Revolutionary War

Andrew Lewis (October 9, 1720 – September 26, 1781) was an Irish-born American surveyor, military officer and politician. Born in County Donegal, he moved with his family to the British colony of Virginia at a young age. A colonel in the Virginia militia during the French and Indian War, and brigadier general in the American Revolutionary War, his most famous victory was the Battle of Point Pleasant in Dunmore's War in 1774, although he also drove Lord Dunmore's forces from Norfolk and Gwynn's Island in 1776. He also helped found Liberty Hall (later Washington and Lee University) in 1776.

== Early life ==
Andrew Lewis was born in County Donegal, Ireland on October 9, 1720. His parents were John Lewis and his wife, the former Margaret Lynn. Circa 1729, John fled across the Atlantic Ocean to the British colony of Pennsylvania with at least his older sons and perhaps 30 retainers after killing the family's landlord, Sir Mungo Campbell, in an altercation. By 1732, his wife had also emigrated to the colony, where she gave birth to their youngest son, Charles. The Lewis' settled in the upper end of the Shenandoah Valley in the colony of Virginia. Ultimately, her brother Charles remained in Ireland (presumably inheriting the family estate), while her brother Dr. William Lynn also emigrated to the Virginia colony, where he settled comfortably in the port city of Fredericksburg, where he died in 1757.

Meanwhile, before 1736, King George II of England had already awarded 118,491 acres of land, including the Shenandoah Valley land on which the Lewises had settled, to the Tidewater aristocrat William Beverley, who promised to survey and develop it, but remained near the colonial capital and proposed to sell the land to those already squatting upon it. The Lewises were among the first white settlers in what became Augusta County, Virginia in 1745 (with John Lewis and his eldest son Thomas becoming two of the original justices of the peace). Beverley appreciated John having built a fort for protection against Native Americans upset with the settlers, as well as providing hospitality to the settlers. On April 22, 1738, the Governor's Council of Virginia (on which Beverley sat) acknowledged having received a petition from pioneers in the Shenandoah Valley which mentioned John Lewis as their captain in defending against marauding natives. On February 20, 1739, John Lewis and three others acquired title to land in what was then called "Beverly Manor" (with Lewis' parcel of 2,071 acres on both sides of the creek named after him and on which he had erected a mill being the largest, and at a bargain price of 14 pound sterling). By the end of the year his eldest sons (Thomas Lewis and this man) and three prominent Tidewater gentleman also received land grants totaling 30,000 acres south and west of the parcel granted their father and Tidewater lawyer Edward Barradall, in what ultimately became Bath County.

=== Surveyor and explorer ===
Lewis received a basic education as well as learned the mathematics and other skills of a surveyor. He spent at least fifteen years farming and working as a surveyor in southwestern Virginia. In 1751 he and his father explored much of the Greenbrier District of Augusta County (which much later became later Greenbrier County, West Virginia). John Lewis supposedly named the Greenbrier River after getting stuck in a patch of the thorny plant. Andrew Lewis also served as county lieutenant and later captain in the Augusta County militia.

=== Personal life ===
Early in the 1740s, Andrew Lewis married Elizabeth Givens, daughter of Samuel and Sarah (Cathey) Givens, formerly of County Antrim, Ireland. They established their own home, called "Richfield", considerably south of Staunton in what later became Roanoke County near Salem. Their children included: Samuel (c.1748-1763), John (1750–1788), Thomas (1752–1800), Andrew Jr. (1759–1844), Anna (who married Andrew Lambert (1768–1845))), William (1764–1812) and Charles (c.1768-1781). Their granddaughter Agatha Strother (1779–1852), married Elijah McClanahan.

== French and Indian War ==
The Virginia frontier became a battleground in the French and Indian War, as did the frontiers of the more northerly colonies of Pennsylvania (which like Virginia also claimed land west of the Appalachian Mountains) and Maryland (whose boundary ended at the Appalachians). Virginia organized provincial troops to defend settlers subject to attacks by Indians upset at encroachments into their territories; Lewis became a captain in George Washington's Virginia Regiment. After the loss at the Battle of Great Meadows in 1754, Washington was forced to surrender to the French. Lewis was then at Fort Necessity (now in Pennsylvania) and likewise retreated eastward across the Appalachians.

Washington proposed a series of frontier fortifications to protect settlers east of the Appalachians. Lewis initially built Fort Dinwiddie on the Jackson River of present-day Bath County, but was relieved of his command September 21, 1755. The Virginia assembly soon approved Lewis' promotion to major and assigned him to oversee the region along the Greenbrier River. On February 18, 1756, Lewis led the Sandy Creek Expedition from Fort Prince George (modern day Roanoke, Virginia) with a mixed force of militiamen and Cherokees to raid the Shawnee towns along the Big Sandy and Ohio rivers to retaliate for Shawnee attacks. Lewis led several expeditions against both Indian settlements and French outposts. During the Forbes Expedition, Lewis was captured during Major James Grant's attack on Fort Duquesne in September 1758. Taken to Quebec, Lewis remained a prisoner until late 1759.

== Between wars ==
The Proclamation of 1763 officially restricted Virginia's western expansion across the Appalachians, but Lewis continued his hunting and exploration trips into what later became West Virginia. When relative peace returned, Lewis entered politics. Three years after the formation of Botetourt County from Augusta County in 1769, Botetourt County voters elected Lewis and John Bowyer as their part-time representatives in the House of Burgesses and reelected the pair several times before 1780, though the grueling travel to Williamsburg or later Richmond, as well as the American Revolution precluded much attendance in later years.

In 1774, Virginia's Governor Dunmore led a force to Fort Pitt and into the Ohio Country, in what became known as Dunmore's War. Lewis, now promoted to colonel, led a second force by a more southern route. Shawnee Chief Cornstalk attacked Lewis' force while it was camped at the Ohio River crossing at Point Pleasant. Lewis' victory in the Battle of Point Pleasant on October 10, 1774, secured his military reputation.

Lewis became one of the founding trustees of Liberty Hall, formerly the Augusta Academy, along with his brother Thomas Lewis, Samuel McDowell, Sampson Mathews, George Moffett, William Preston, and James Waddel. In 1776 the academy was renamed in a burst of revolutionary fervor and relocated to Lexington, Virginia. Chartered in 1782 by the new Commonwealth of Virginia, Liberty Hall was again renamed, to Washington College. After the American Civil War it became Washington and Lee University, and is now the nation's ninth oldest institution of higher education.

== American Revolution ==
When the American Revolution began, Governor Dunmore suspended Virginia's legislature. The Whigs (soon to become American rebels) formed a provisional Virginia legislature, which included both Andrew Lewis (from Botetourt County) and his brother Thomas (from Augusta County) as delegates. When the Continental Congress created a Continental Army in 1775 and made George Washington its commander, he asked that Lewis be made a brigadier general. Initially the Continental Congress had decided there should be only one general from each state, and the more experienced Charles Lee became Virginia's only commissioned Brigadier General.

In March 1776, Lewis became a brigadier general, overseeing Virginia's defense and raising men for the Continental Army. Virginia's Committee of Safety called on Lewis to stop Governor Dunmore's raids along the coast from his last stronghold, a fortified position on Gwynn's Island in the Chesapeake Bay. On July 9, 1776, Lewis led Virginia's forces which captured the island as Lord Dunmore escaped by sea, sailing to the Caribbean, never to return. Thus Lewis protected Norfolk and the Hampton Roads area.

On April 15, 1777, Lewis resigned his commission, citing poor health. He also faced discontent among his men as well as in the army as a whole. Lt. Thomas Townes, present at Gwynn's Island, wrote, "Lewis who after the enemy (Lord Dunmore) were vanquished proved a traitor & suffered them to escape". Moreover, Lewis was bypassed when promotions were announced for Major General in early 1777. George Washington, in need of every able officer, expressed his disappointment to Lewis, who replied, "In my last I intimated to your Excellency the impossibility of my remaining in a disagreeable situation in the army. My being superseded must be viewed as an implicit impeachment of my character. I therefore requested a court of inquiry into my conduct. I believe the time is now at hand, when I can leave this department without any damage to the public interest. When that is the case, I will wait on your Excellency, not doubting my request will be granted, and that I shall be able to acquit myself of every charge, which malice or envy can bring against me." March 17, 1777.

== Later years and death ==
Botetourt County voters continued to support Lewis and in 1780 elected him to the Virginia House of Delegates following formation of the Commonwealth, though his service proved brief because later that year, Governor Thomas Jefferson appointed him to the Executive Council. The following year, Lewis fell ill while returning home from a council meeting; he died of fever in Bedford County near Lynchburg on September 26. His remains were returned for burial in the family plot at his home, where his grave site was unmarked. Colonel Elijah McClanahan, who married Lewis' granddaughter, Agatha Lewis McClanahan, attended his funeral as a young man, and later identified his grave to Roanoke County's Clerk of the Court. In 1887 General Lewis' remains were re-interred in the East Hill Cemetery at Salem, Virginia.

== Legacy ==
- Lewisburg, West Virginia, is named after Andrew Lewis.
- A statue of Lewis is among those honoring Virginia patriots (including Thomas Jefferson, Patrick Henry, George Mason, Thomas Nelson, and John Marshall) on Richmond's Washington Monument in Capitol Square.
- A memorial at the Salem Civic Center in Salem, Virginia, features a statue of Lewis next to a cannon.
- Andrew Lewis High School, now Andrew Lewis Middle School, opened in 1931 in Salem. Some residents petitioned unsuccessfully for the new high school in Salem to bear Andrew Lewis' name, but it opened in 1977 as Salem High School.
- On March 13, 2001, the General Assembly of Virginia designated the portion of Interstate 81 that traverses Rockbridge, Botetourt, and Roanoke Counties, and the city of Salem as the "Andrew Lewis Memorial Highway."
- The Tri-State Area Council of the Boy Scouts of America named its reservation in Ona, West Virginia (near Huntington) after the general.
