= John Lewis (Virginia colonist) =

American militia officer (1678–1762)

- Born: 1 February 1678; County Donegal, Ireland
- Died: 1 February 1762 (aged 84); Staunton, Colony of Virginia
- Years active: 1737-1753
- Known for: western Virginia pioneer and military leader, founder of the Lewis family of Virginia and other areas
- Title: Augusta County magistrate, militia colonel, Augusta County justice of the peace
- Spouse: Margaret Lynn Lewis (1693-1773)
- Parent(s): Andrew Lewis and Mary Colquhoun
- Relatives: Samuel Lewis (son), Thomas Lewis (son), Andrew Lewis (son), Alice Lewis (daughter), William Lynn Lewis (son), Margaret Lynn Lewis (daughter), Anne Lewis (daughter), Charles Lewis (son), James Patton (nephew)
- Military career
- Allegiance: Colony of Virginia
- Service years: 1738-?
- Rank: Colonel of the Augusta County Militia
- Units: Virginia militia, Augusta County militia

John Lewis (1 February 1678 - 1 February 1762), the founder of the prominent Lewis family in the westernmost part of the Colony of Virginia, was a militia officer, magistrate and pioneering farmer. Born in northern Ireland, he emigrated across the Atlantic Ocean to escape after killing his landlord. He settled in Virginia and, together with his nephew James Patton, became wealthy through land grants and sales during expansion of Virginia's westward frontier.

Lewis and his eldest son Thomas became magistrates upon the creation of Augusta County and helped found Staunton, the county seat and gateway to the west during their lifetime. Thomas Lewis also served in the House of Burgesses, and many descendants would likewise achieve high political office. His second son Andrew Lewis became prominent during the French and Indian War and achieved rank of general in the American Revolutionary War, where he became known for his victory at the Battle of Point Pleasant. His youngest brother, Charles, died in that battle. For many years, the senior Lewis engaged in a heated rivalry with his nephew Patton over land grants, judicial power, and the construction of a parish meeting house. He died at his home in Staunton, Virginia at the age of 84.

== Birth and early life ==
John Lewis was born on 1 February 1678 in County Donegal, Ireland. His parents were Andrew Lewis and Mary Colquhoun, and his father's family reportedly were French Huguenots who had left France for Ireland.

Lewis was forced to flee Ireland circa 1728, allegedly after killing his landlord in an altercation over inflated rent. According to the family's later accounts, the Lewises leased land in County Donegal from a "proud, profligate and extravagant" man named Sir Mungo Campbell, who tried to coerce his tenants to pay inflated rents. When Lewis protested, Campbell came to his home at night to evict Lewis and his family. He fired a musket loaded with buckshot into the house, wounding Lewis's wife in the hand and killing his disabled brother. Lewis came out holding a shillelagh, and used it to kill Campbell and his steward. Fearful that Campbell's family would take revenge, Lewis, in disguise, and "about thirty of his faithful tenantry" obtained passage on a ship bound for the Kingdom of Portugal. One 19th century account claimed that much later after an investigation, Irish authorities pardoned Lewis and granted land in western Virginia in compensation for the attack on his home. (Note: Some doubt was cast on the story of the landlord's death, by the great-great-granddaughter of Mary Elizabeth McDowell Greenlee, who in the 1880s claimed that Lewis had in fact killed a man, but that the story was a fiction designed to cover the "ugly" truth. Howard McKnight Wilson also disputes the story, although Patricia Givens Johnson finds it credible. In 1869, a magazine called The Land We Love published "The Valley Manuscript," purportedly the first part of "The Common-Place Book of me Margaret Lewis, née Lynn, of Loch Lynn, Scotland." Supposedly the diary of Lewis's wife Margaret Lynn Lewis, it purported to provide an eyewitness account of John Lewis's killing of his landlord in Ireland. Although republished several times, in 1976 it was revealed as a hoax, written by "Fanny Fielding," pseudonym of Mary Jane Stith Sturges (1828-1891, née Upshur).)

By 1729 Lewis and at least some family members had arrived in Philadelphia. After a brief period in Lancaster, Pennsylvania, by 1732 Lewis traveled southwest to the Shenandoah Valley where he built a fortified home on Lewis Creek just a few miles south of what became Staunton, Virginia, and where his wife joined him.

== Marriage and children ==
John Lewis married Margaret Lynn (James Patton's maternal aunt) in 1715 in County Donegal. She was born on 3 July 1693 in County Donegal and was the daughter of William Lynn and Margaret Patton. By 1732, Margaret had also emigrated to the Virginia colony, where she gave birth to their youngest son, Charles Lewis. Margaret bore eight children:

1. Samuel Lewis, born 1716
2. Thomas Lewis, 1718-1790, Virginia surveyor, landowner and politician, husband of Jane Strother of Fredericksburg
3. Andrew Lewis, 1720-1781, brigadier general during the American Revolutionary War.
4. Alice Lewis, born 1722
5. William Lynn Lewis, 1724-1812, surveyor and landowner in what much later became West Virginia
6. Margaret Lynn Lewis, 1726-1797
7. Anne Lewis, born 1728
8. Charles Lewis, born 1735 and killed at the Battle of Point Pleasant in 1774.

== Homes and properties ==
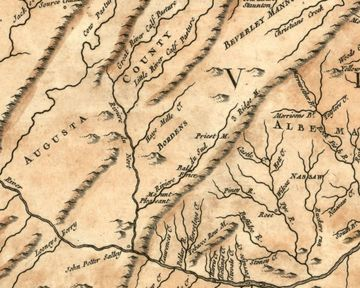
Borden's Tract, where John Lewis established his first home in Virginia, on land owned by Benjamin Borden. Depicted on a 1757 map of Virginia and Maryland.

Meanwhile, before 1736, King George II of England had already awarded 118,491 acres of land, including the Shenandoah Valley land on which the Lewises had settled, to the Tidewater aristocrat William Beverley, who promised to survey and develop it, but remained near the colonial capital and proposed to sell the land to those already squatting upon it. The Lewises were among the first white settlers in what became Augusta County, Virginia in 1745 (with John Lewis and his eldest son Thomas becoming two of the original justices of the peace). Meanwhile Beverley showed his appreciation for John having built a fort for protection against Native Americans upset with the settlers, as well as for his providing hospitality to the settlers. On April 22, 1738, the Governor's Council of Virginia (on which Beverly sat) acknowledged having received a petition from pioneers in the Shenandoah Valley which mentioned John Lewis as their captain in defending against the natives. In 1738 Beverley hired Lewis as a representative in charge of surveying and selling plots of land from the Beverley Manor. Lewis acquired an official title for his land and mill in Beverley Manor (2,071 acres) on 21 February 1738 at a bargain price of 14 pounds sterling, and for his land on Borden's tract on 20 February 1739. By 1751, Lewis owned 9,313 acres in Augusta County.). By the end of the year his eldest sons (Thomas and Andrew Lewis) and three prominent Tidewater gentlemen also received land grants totaling 30,000 acres south and west of the parcel granted their father and Tidewater lawyer Edward Barradall, in what ultimately became Bath County.

Lewis's first homestead was located on the Middle River in Augusta County, but by 1732 he had moved to a property known as Belle-fonte (also Bellefont and other spellings) on Lewis Creek. He arrived with the first European settlers on Borden's grant, and was probably one of the first settlers on the Beverley grant. In 1738, Lewis's nephew James Patton arrived at Lewis Creek with his family, including the eight-year-old William Preston, after which Patton returned to England for his final voyages as a merchant sea captain.

In February 1747 Lewis applied for permission to build a mill, and in March 1747 he applied for an ordinary (tavern) license. The mill was in construction by May 1751, when Lewis went to court to prevent the construction of a second mill in Staunton.

In 1756 "Fort Lewis," a stockade fort, was constructed by Lewis's son Charles to guard the strategic pass of the Shenandoah Mountain. A large stone mansion, now known as Fort Lewis, was later built nearby, probably by Charles Lewis, although some sources say that it was John Lewis's home for at least a short time. The building has undergone substantial renovation over the years, but the original stone section of the ground floor is still visible.

== Religious activities ==
In 1738 Lewis hosted James Anderson, Presbyterian minister from the Synod of Philadelphia, the first minister to deliver a sermon in the upper Shenandoah Valley. The Reverend John Craig arrived in 1740 as permanent Presbyterian minister of the parish.

== Military service ==
On 22 April 1738, the Virginia Council appointed Lewis captain over the settlers in Beverly Manor, where Indians had been stealing items and had killed a farmer. The order states:

"Whereas the Inhabitants on Sherrando River by their petition have represented that the Northern Indians frequently passing through their plantations Commit frequent Outrages and have lately killed one of their men, And have prayed for a Supply of Arms & Ammunition for their defense, It is the Opinion of this Board and Accordingly Ordered that His Majesty's Stores there be delivered to John Lewis Gent who is hereby Approved to be a Capt over such of the Inhabitants as live in Beverly Manor, Thirty Muskets & Eight pair of Pistols with a proportionable quantity of Powder & Ball..."

Lewis was, however, ordered not to "offer any Violence to any of the said Indians passing quietly through their plantations nor to any Indians whatsoever unless the said Indians do first Commit Hostilities on the said Inhabitants in which case only they are at liberty to defend themselves and to Act offensively."

John Lewis was appointed colonel of the Augusta County militia on 22 February 1739.

== Legal roles ==
On 3 November 1741, John Lewis was among the first Justices of the Peace appointed for Augusta County, after its formation in 1738. When Augusta County was incorporated in 1745, Lewis was appointed magistrate by Governor William Gooch on 30 October. The first session of the Augusta County Court convened on 9 December 1745.

For several years, Lewis engaged in competition with his nephew James Patton over control of the court. Patton was named Chief Magistrate and President of the county court, but his duties as sheriff initially kept him occupied, and Lewis sat on the bench during 13 out of 15 regularly scheduled court days during the first half of 1746. Then on 14 June 1746, Lewis was appointed sheriff for Augusta County, replacing Patton, and from July 1746 to May 1749, Patton took over the court, presiding over forty-five out of fifty-two regularly scheduled court days as well as ten out of eleven additional courts called for individual criminal trials, essentially replacing Lewis entirely as magistrate. Possibly due to his military duties, after June 1749 Patton distanced himself from the court and Lewis presided on twenty-five out of the forty-three court days for the next two years. Lewis served as a member of the Augusta County Court until at least 1752.

== Land grants ==
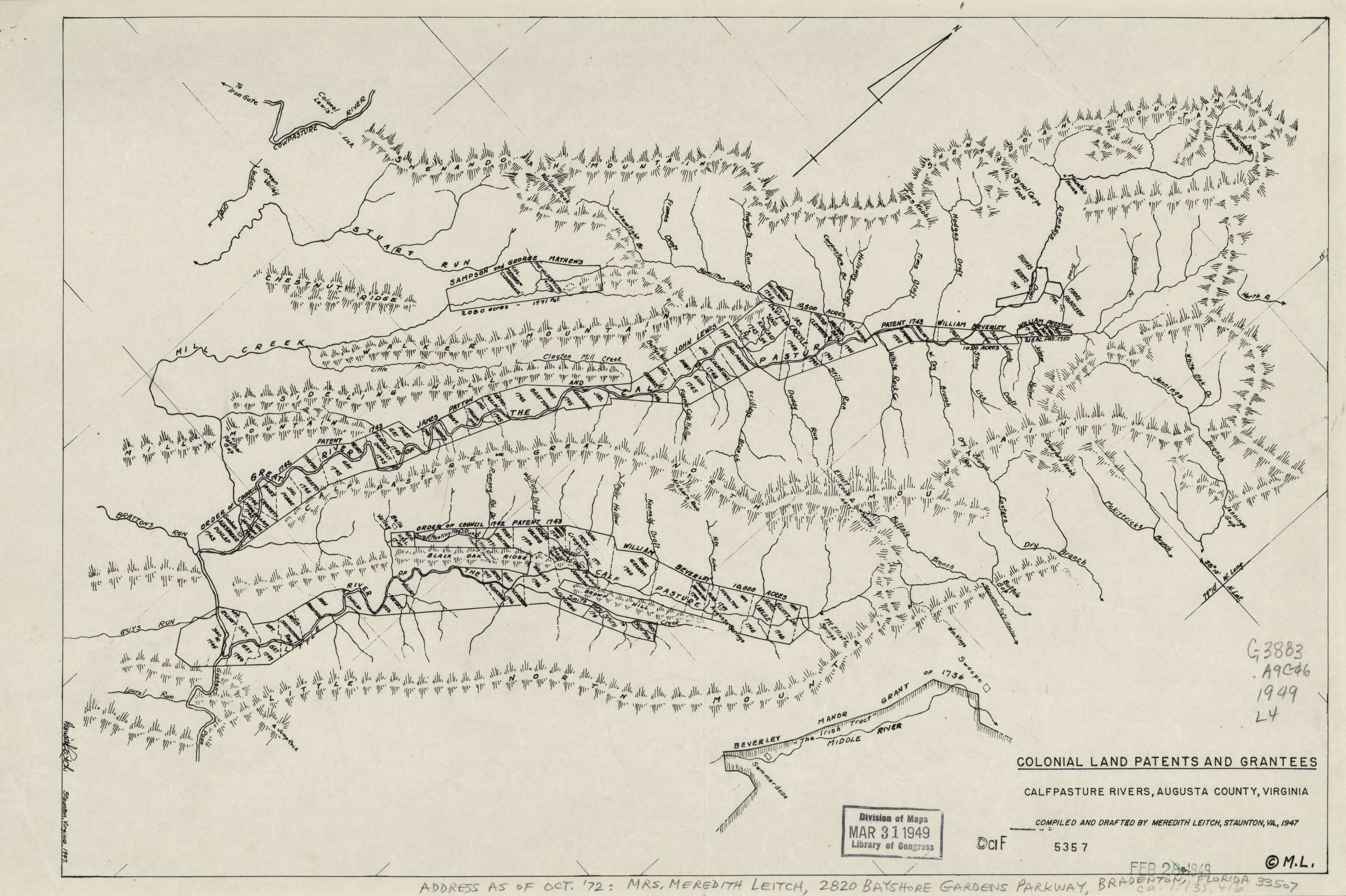
Colonial land grants in Augusta County, showing the 10,500 acre grant obtained by James Patton and John Lewis in 1743 along the Calfpasture River, just left of the map's center.

By 1737, Lewis and other partners were acquiring grants for large tracts of land outside Beverley Manor, including the Calfpasture River areas. Lewis and Patton received a patent for 10,500 acres along that river in 1743.

In 1745, a grant of 100,000 acres was made to John Lewis and his associates under the Greenbrier Company. Much of this land was located on the Greenbrier River, a name given by John Lewis. Lewis had his sons Andrew and Thomas trained as surveyors in order to maintain control over the surveying process of the Greenbrier Company. In 1751, Lewis and his son Andrew completed surveys of the Greenbrier tract. Thomas eventually received professional certification as a surveyor from the College of William and Mary and was appointed surveyor for Augusta County.

In 1748, Lewis collaborated with his nephew, James Patton, and Dr. Thomas Walker in the formation of the Loyal Land Company of Virginia. A grant was made to the company on July 12, 1748, according to the Virginia Council records: "To John Lewis Esq. & others eight hundred thousand acres in one or more surveys, beginning on the bounds between this colony and North Carolina, and running to the Westward and to the North, so as to include the said Quantity." The company was given four years in which to survey the tract and purchase enough rights so that smaller grants could then be issued. On 14 June 1753, they received an additional four years in which to complete the surveys because of conflicting claims by other settlers.

Patton had decided in 1745 to form his own company, known initially as the Wood's River Company, and later as the New River Company, and entered into direct competition with his uncle. In January 1753, Patton applied for a 100,000 acre grant and Lewis went to court to prevent him from receiving it, stating that Patton's claim included lands previously claimed by the Loyal Land Company.

== Dispute with James Patton ==
Although Lewis and Patton collaborated frequently, they eventually became rivals and enemies. The Reverend John Craig wrote: "...a Difference happened between Col. John Lewis & Col. James Patton, both Living in that Congregation, which Continued while they Lived, Which of them Should be highest in Commission & power."

Since August 1748, Lewis had been contracted by the Augusta County parish to construct several public buildings, including a home for the parish minister as well as the parish meeting house, for which Lewis was to be paid a total of £148. Lewis therefore felt that he had final say in the location of the parish meeting house. Patton had risen quickly in prominence since arriving in Virginia, and was appointed magistrate, County Sheriff, Justice of the Peace, collector of duties on furs and skins, escheator, coroner, and Chief Commander of the Augusta County Militia. He was also among the ten elected commissioners of the Tinkling Spring congregation in 1741 and underwrote the cost of the meeting house's construction. In the end, Patton selected the location of the meeting house, and Lewis remained at odds with him afterwards. Craig wrote, "[They] could not agree for several years upon a plan or manner, where to build [the Tinkling Spring Meeting House], which gave me a very great trouble...their disputes ran so high...I could neither bring them to friendship with each other, nor obtain both their friendships at once, ever after. This continued for thirteen or fourteen years, till Colonel Patton was murdered by the Indians."

Lewis completed the other parish buildings and was paid in May 1750. In November 1752, parish leaders declared that Lewis had not in fact completed all the glebe buildings as promised, and required him to contract a builder at his own expense, to complete the remaining buildings.

== Death and burial ==
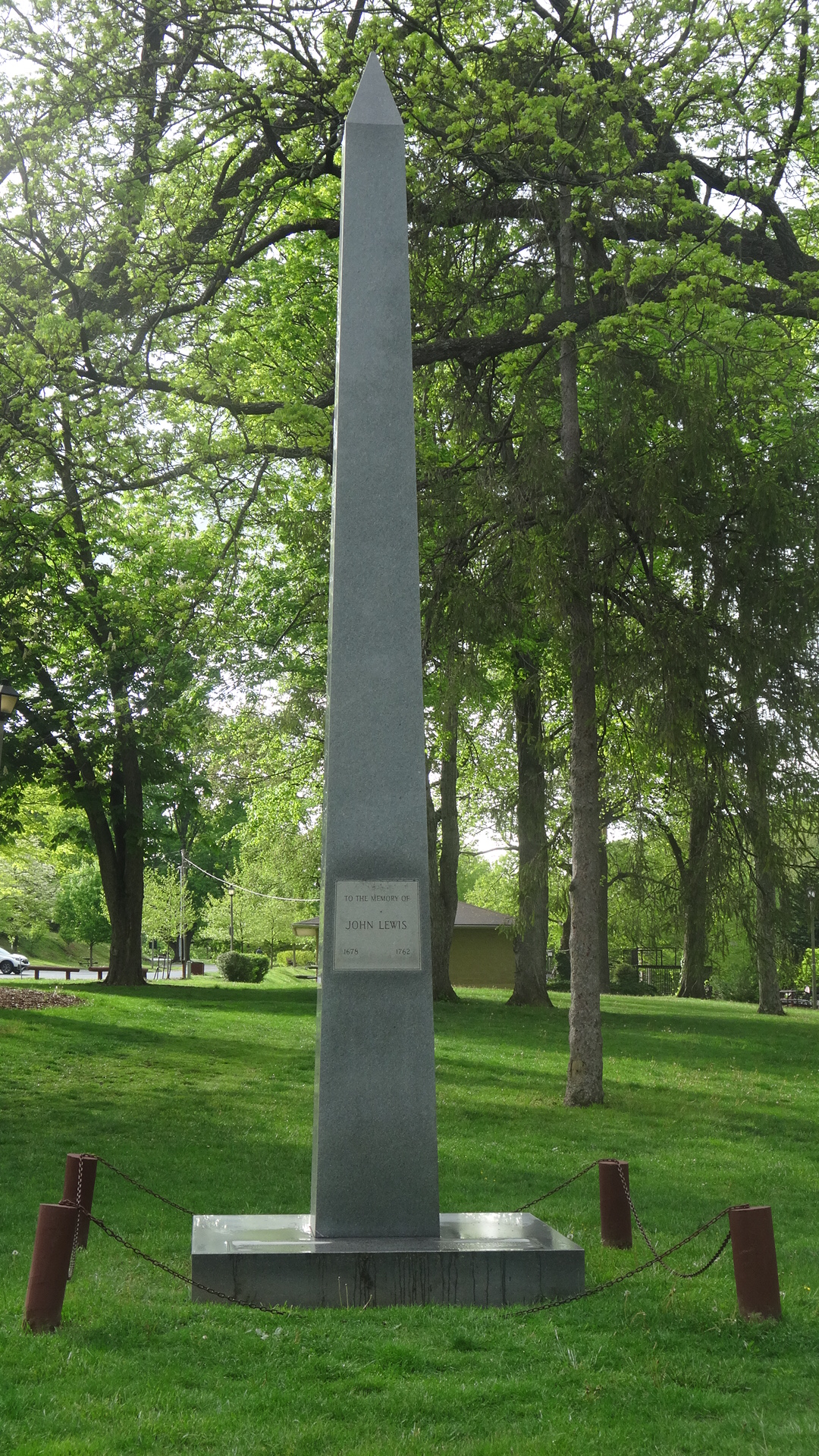
John Lewis Memorial at Gypsy Hill Park in Staunton, Virginia.

Lewis wrote his will on 28 November 1761, and died at age 84 on 1 February 1762. He is buried on what was, at the time, his Bellefonte estate outside Staunton, near the present-day Regional Wastewater Treatment Plant. His grave marker is inscribed with these words:

"Here lies the remains of John Lewis who slew the Irish Lord. Settled Augusta County, located the town of Staunton and furnished five sons to fight the battles of the American Revolution. He was the son of Andrew Lewis and Mary Calhoun and was born in Donegal County, Ireland in 1678 and died Feb'y 1st, 1762, aged 84 years. He was a brave man, a true patriot and a friend of liberty throughout the world. Mortalitate relicta vivit immortalitate inductus. (Latin: "Having left mortality, he lives clad in immortality.")"

His son Dr. William Lewis inherited his father's lands in the Beverly Manor tract and the following year bought from William Beverly's eldest son and administrator, Robert Beverly two additional parcels there, of 320 acres and 120 acres, in what would become Botetourt County in 1770. Dr. William Beverly surveyed the land in 1763, which included the tract that included Sweet Springs, in what became Monroe County in 1799. William had already named his son John Lewis (1755-1823) after his father, and after the American Revolutionary War, in which Dr. William Lewis served as an infantry colonel and his brother Andrew Lewis as General, they developed the area above the headwaters of the James River.

== Memorialization ==
An obelisk monument, erected on 31 May 1962 in Gypsy Hill Park in Staunton by the John Lewis Society, honors John Lewis. In 1891, Lewis's great-great-grandson John Lewis Peyton wrote to the city proposing that Lewis's remains and those of his wife be moved to Gypsy Hill Park from Bellefonte estate and reburied under a memorial. The Staunton City Council erected the memorial but the graves were not relocated.

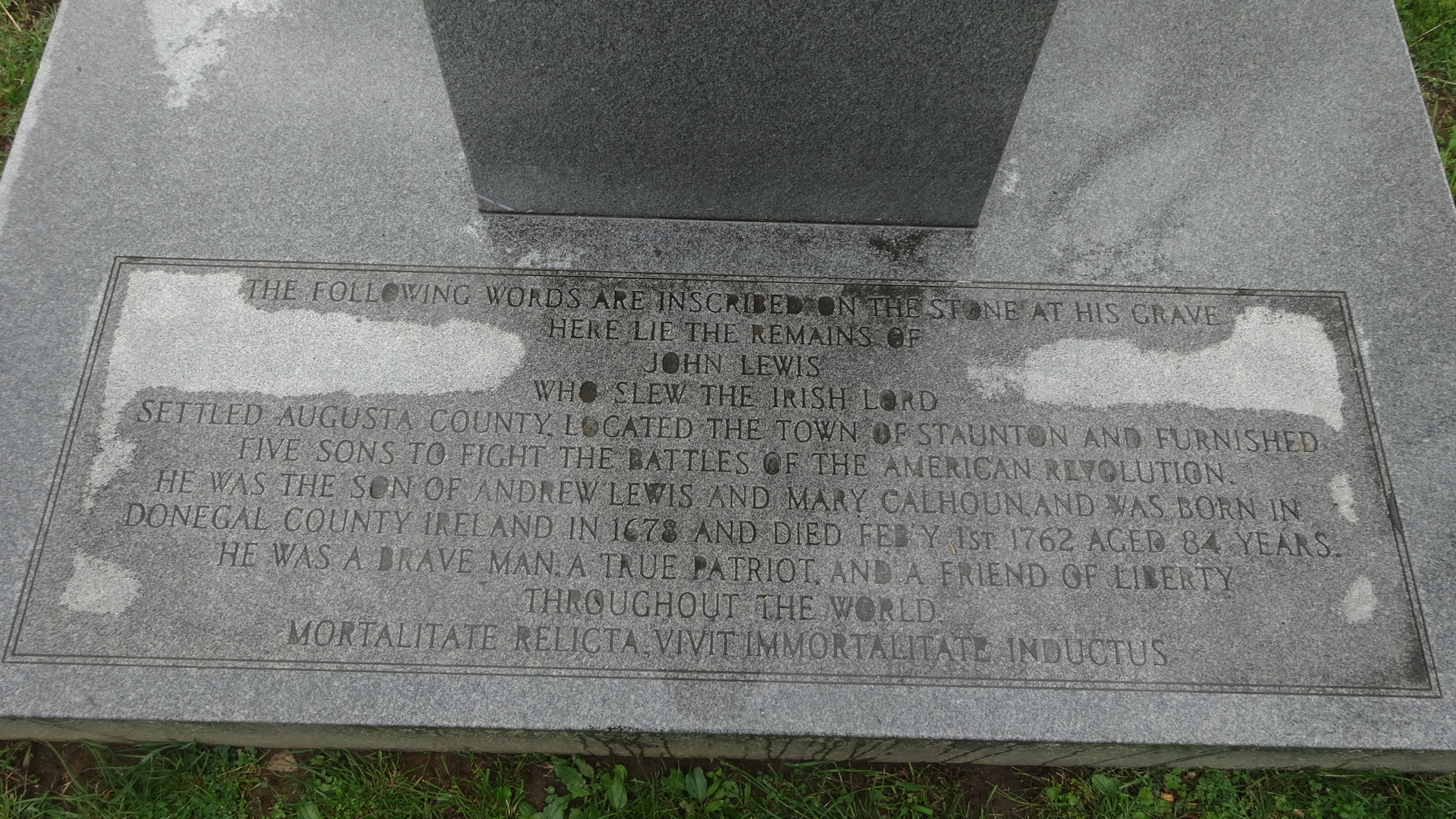
Inscription at the base of the John Lewis Memorial.

The Shawnee chief Quatawapea adopted the Anglo sobriquet "Colonel John Lewis" in honor of John Lewis.

On 13 March 2001, the Virginia General Assembly passed an act to designate that portion of Interstate Route 81 within the boundaries of Augusta County the "John Lewis Memorial Highway" in honor of John Lewis.

== See also ==
- James Patton
- William Beverley
- Andrew Lewis
- Thomas Lewis
