= Steephill (Staunton, Virginia) =

Historic house in Virginia, United States

- U.S. National Register of Historic Places
- Virginia Landmarks Register
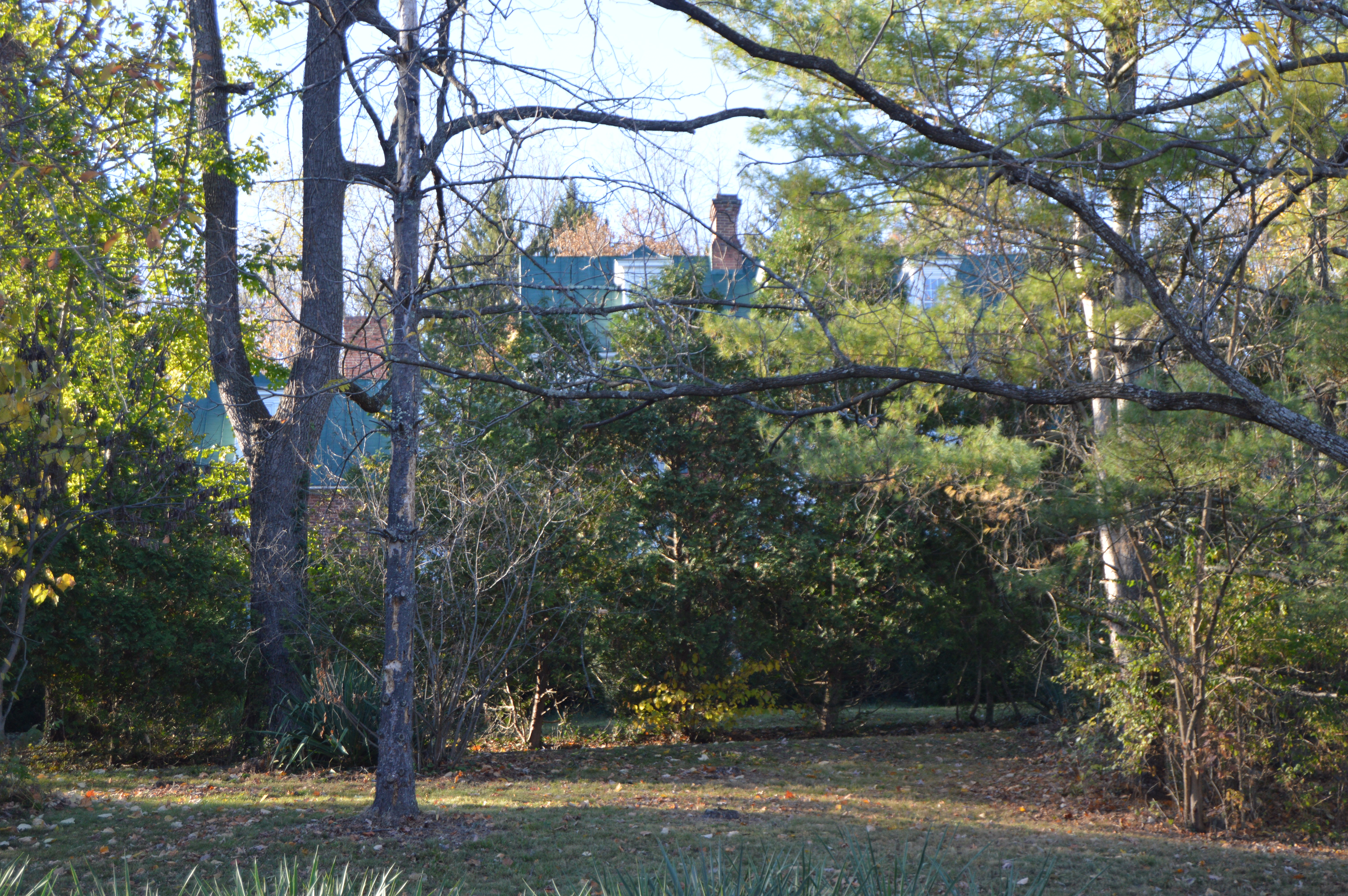
- Looking toward the house through its surrounding trees

- Location within Virginia Location within the United States
- Location: 200 Park Blvd., Staunton, Virginia, U.S.
- Coordinates: 38°9′22″N 79°5′15″W
- Area: 3.7 acres (1.5 ha)
- Built: 1877-1878, 1926-1927
- Built by: Sam Collins
- Architectural style: Gothic, Georgian Revival
- NRHP reference No.: 84003599
- VLR No.: 132-0031

Significant dates
- Added to NRHP: February 23, 1984
- Designated VLR: January 17, 1984

Steephill, also known as Steep Hill, is a historic home built in c. 1878 and located at Staunton, Virginia. It was added to the National Register of Historic Places in 1984. It also went by the name Peyton Estate, it had been the family home for John Lewis Peyton and his heirs until 1964.

== History ==
It was built in 1877–1878 in the Gothic Revival style, and remodeled in 1926–1927 in the Georgian Revival style. The central portion of the house (the "original" house) is a 2 1/2-story, three-bay, brick structure slightly recessed from the wings. The central section has a standing-seam metal gable roof with three gabled dormers. Flanking the central block are two, two-story wings.

In 1964, the Peyton family heir's sold the family estate to Staunton Military Academy. On December 30, 2019, the Steephill structure suffered a large amount of damage from a 2nd alarm fire.
