= Samuel McDowell =

American judge

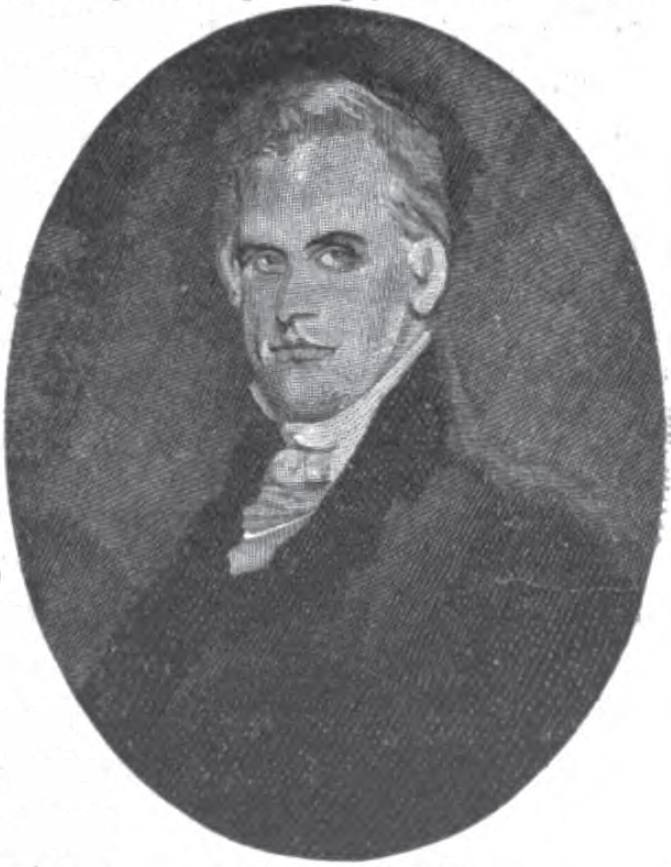
- Born: October 29, 1735; Province of Pennsylvania
- Died: September 25, 1817 (aged 81); Near Danville, Kentucky
- Relatives: Father of Ephraim McDowell
- Military career
- Allegiance: Thirteen Colonies
- Branch: Virginia militia
- Rank: Colonel
- Conflicts: French and Indian War, Lord Dunmore's War, American Revolutionary War

Samuel McDowell (October 29, 1735 – September 25, 1817) was a soldier in three wars and political leader in Virginia and Kentucky. He served under George Washington in the French and Indian War, as an aide-de-camp to Isaac Shelby in Lord Dunmore's War, and under Nathanael Greene during the Revolutionary War. He then relocated to Kentucky and became a surveyor. Later, he was appointed one of the first district court judges in what would become the state of Kentucky. He became a leader of the movement to separate Kentucky from Virginia, and presided over nine of the state's ten constitutional conventions. He was the father of Ephraim McDowell.

== Early life ==
Samuel McDowell was born in the Province of Pennsylvania on October 29, 1735. He was the son of Captain John McDowell and grandson of Ephraim McDowell, a Scots-Irish patriot in the English Revolution of 1688. Captain McDowell relocated his family to Virginia in 1737. Samuel McDowell was well-educated in his youth, at one time studying under Archibald Alexander. In December 1742, McDowell's father was killed at the Battle of Galudoghson and he inherited the entire estate, according to the tradition of primogeniture, but chose to divide the estate with his brother and sister.

McDowell married Mary McClung on January 17, 1754. They had seven sons and four daughters. Sons Joseph, Samuel Jr. both served in the Revolutionary War. Joseph also served in the War of 1812, as did the eldest son, John. Samuel Jr. was also the first United States Marshal in Kentucky. The most famous of McDowell's sons was Dr. Ephraim McDowell, who performed the first ovariotomy. Ephraim McDowell later married the daughter of Isaac Shelby, his father's former commanding officer. Samuel was also the 2nd great-grandfather of First Lady Mary Todd Lincoln through his daughter Elizabeth.

== Virginia soldier and politician ==
At age twenty, McDowell participated in the French and Indian War. He was captain of a company, serving under George Washington at Braddock's Defeat at the Battle of the Monongahela. Later, he served in Lord Dunmore's War, participating in the Battle of Point Pleasant with future Kentucky governor Isaac Shelby. Shelby later appointed McDowell as his aide-de-camp. For his service in the war, he was awarded a large tract of land in Fayette County, Kentucky in 1775.

In 1773, voters from then-vast Augusta County, Virginia elected McDowell as one of their representatives in the Virginia House of Burgesses. After Virginia's Governor, Lord Dunmore, dismissed the legislature, Augusta County voters again elected McDowell to represent them at what later became known as the Virginia Revolutionary Conventions, including the March 20, 1775 conference in Richmond, Virginia to make preparation for the Revolutionary War. Convention members selected him and Thomas Lewis to carry a letter to several delegates to the upcoming Second Continental Congress, thanking them for their actions. McDowell and Lewis both served in the Virginia Conventions in 1775 and 1776. McDowell also attended a second conference in Williamsburg, Virginia in 1776 where he declared the rights of man and instructed the Continental Congress to declare the colonies' independence.

McDowell also was a founding trustee of Liberty Hall (formerly the Augusta Academy) which in 1776 became a college and relocated to Lexington. Other founding trustees included Andrew Lewis, Thomas Lewis, Sampson Mathews, George Moffett, William Preston, and James Waddel. Finally chartered in 1782, Liberty Hall was again renamed, to Washington College and finally Washington and Lee University, and now is the ninth oldest institution of higher education in the country.

At the outbreak of the Revolutionary War, McDowell was commissioned a colonel over a regiment from Augusta County. He participated in the Battle of Guilford Courthouse while serving under General Nathanael Greene. His son John also participated in this battle. The elder McDowell was present at Charles Cornwallis' surrender at Yorktown.

== Formation of Kentucky ==
Following the war, McDowell presided over a 1782 convention that framed a constitution for the independent territory of Kentucky. From 1782 to 1784, he served on the board of trustees for Washington and Lee University. He was appointed surveyor of Fayette County, where he relocated in 1783. Together with John Floyd and George Muter, McDowell was appointed to the district court in Harrodsburg, the first such court in Kentucky. Following his appointment, he moved to Mercer County, Kentucky. In 1786, he presided over the first county court in Kentucky District.

On the night of December 27, 1786, a group consisting of Harry Innes, Thomas Todd, John Brown, Christopher Greenup, John Belli, and Robert Craddock assembled at McDowell's residence and formed a debating society known as the Danville Political Club. McDowell continued to host meetings of the Club at his residence from time-to-time, and participated in its activities for its entire four-year existence. When the town of Danville was organized on December 4, 1787, McDowell was named one of its first trustees.

McDowell presided over nine of the ten conventions that drafted the first Kentucky Constitution. He was chosen as one of Mercer County's electors to choose the first governor and senators from the state.

McDowell died near Danville on September 25, 1817, at the home of his son Joseph.
