= Lynnwood, Rockingham County, Virginia =

Coordinates: 38°18′36″N 78°46′18″W

Lynnwood is a place located in Rockingham County, Virginia in the United States of America; its latitude is 38°18'36" North; longitude 78°46'19" West.

The area was originally settled by John Lewis around 1751, who named the Lynnwood estate after his wife, Margaret Lynn Lewis. Fighting occurred at the Lynnwood estate during the Battle of Port Republic. In 1871, a post office was established at Lynnwood with A. L. Wagner as the first postmaster.
