= Fort Lewis, Virginia =

Human settlement in Virginia, United States of America

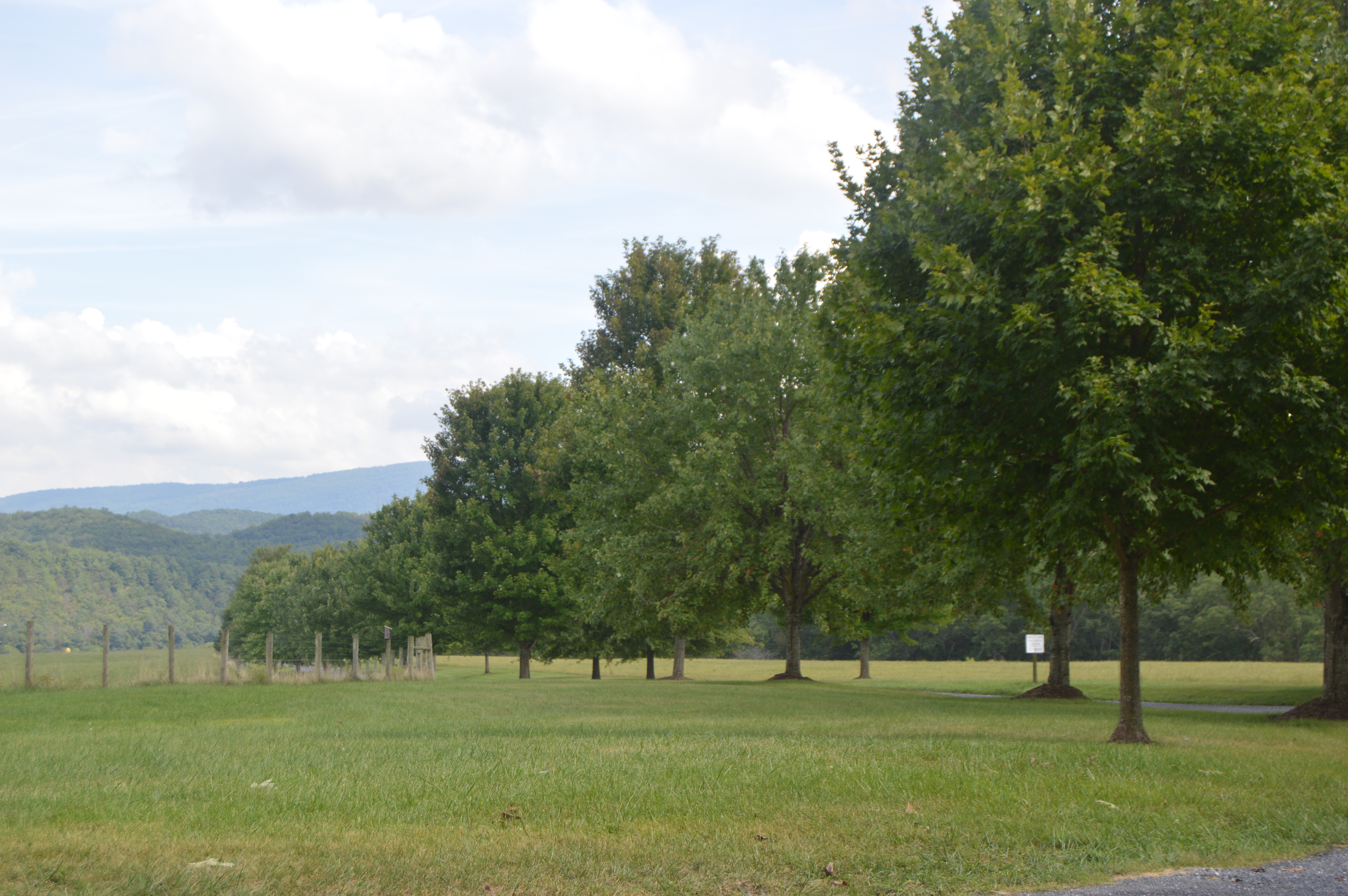
Property entrance

Fort Lewis is a historic estate that contains an antebellum era manor house, a farm and visitors lodge. The area was originally settled by Charles Lewis (son of Colonel John Lewis) in present day Bath County, Virginia, United States. In 1756 he built a small stockade to protect the strategic western end of the Shenandoah Mountain pass from Indian raids. It was one of a series of fortifications authorized by the Virginia Colonial General Assembly along the frontier during the French & Indian War. The stockade is now gone, but the manor house, farm, and reconstructed gristmill remain as part of "Fort Lewis Lodge".

Fort Lewis was listed on the National Register of Historic Places in 2019.
