= Sampson Mathews =

American politician

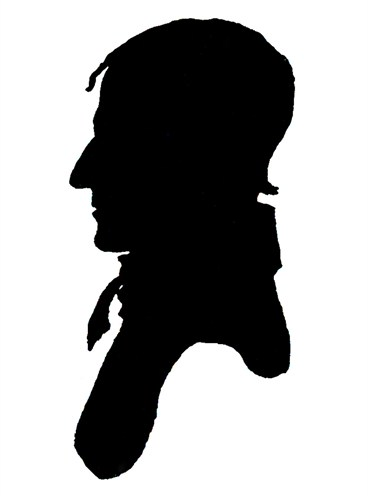
- Silhouette of Sampson Mathews, 1756

Virginia State Senator from Augusta, Rockingham, Rockbridge, Shenandoah, and Pendleton counties
- In office 1776–1780, 1790

Personal details
- Born: c. 1737 Augusta County, Virginia, British America
- Died: January 20, 1807 (aged 70) Staunton, Virginia, U.S.
- Spouse(s): Mary Lockhart; Mary Warwick
- Children: John; Sampson II; Two daughters Martha (guardian ad litem)
- Parent(s): John Mathews; Ann Mathews
- Relatives: Mathews family
- Profession: Merchant, soldier, politician

Military service
- Allegiance: (Kingdom of Great Britain) Great Britain; United States
- Branch/service: Virginia provincial militia Virginia militia
- Years of service: 1755-1774 (colonial forces); 1778-1783 (U.S. forces)
- Rank: Lieutenant Colonel of Virginia militia
- Battles/wars: French and Indian War; Braddock Expedition; Lord Dunmore's War; Battle of Point Pleasant; American Revolutionary War; Raid of Richmond; Battle of Green Spring; Siege of Yorktown

Sampson Mathews (c. 1737 – January 20, 1807) was an American merchant, soldier, and legislator in the colony (and later U.S. state) of Virginia.

A son of John and Ann (Archer) Mathews, Mathews was an early merchant in the Shenandoah Valley region, where he and his brother George Mathews ran a series of stores across the valley with contacts extending to Atlantic trade networks. Mathews also took part in the Indian Wars and colonial revolutionary efforts, being a member of the Augusta County Committee of Safety that drafted the Augusta Resolves and the Augusta Declaration in the lead up to American independence.

Mathews was elected to the inaugural Virginia State Senate in 1776. During the American Revolution, he toured the western frontier to fortify the colonial border from Indian attacks, and oversaw sail manufacture for the Continental Navy's Virginia fleet. When Benedict Arnold enacted a surprise raid on Richmond in January 1781, Mathews led Virginia militia forces in defense.

Mathews was an original trustee of Liberty Hall (later Washington and Lee University), when it was made into a college in 1776. This is the nation's ninth-oldest institution of higher education.

== Early life and Indian Wars ==
Sampson Mathews was born c. 1737 in Augusta County, Virginia to Ann (Archer) and John Mathews. His parents were among the first European settlers of Augusta County, likely having immigrated to America during the Scotch-Irish immigration of 1710–1775. His father was a notable member of the early Augusta County community, serving as a militia captain and public officer, and as a member of the Augusta Parish vestry. The Mathews were among the Anglican minority in the predominantly Presbyterian county. Sampson Mathews was educated at the Augusta Academy, a classical school founded in 1749. In his adolescence he worked in crews to build roads in the county.

On the outbreak of the French and Indian War in 1755, Mathews was elected captain in the Augusta County militia, and accompanied George Washington under British General Edward Braddock on his ill-fated Braddock expedition. Up to four of Mathews' siblings, as well as his father, also took part in the expedition. Braddock's expedition met with the French and Indians in a meeting engagement, from which the French and Indians gained the advantage. After suffering devastating casualties, the British retreated in disarray.

On returning home, Mathews was elected sheriff of Augusta County in 1756, and also assumed the functions of chancellor of the county. For a time he worked as a reader for the Augusta Parish Anglican Church, though this was apparently suspended due to a thinning of the population following the French and Indian War. He was elected to the vestry for Augusta Parish in 1761, and served as such until 1770, when a shift in political population caused the minority Anglicans to lose control of the vestry.

Mathews married Mary Lockhart in 1759, with whom he had four children: John, Sampson, and two daughters who went on to be Mrs. Samuel Clark and Mrs. Alexander Nelson. By 1762, Mathews and his brother George Mathews had gone into a mercantile business in Staunton, Virginia. Quick success lead them to open numerous other stores and outposts in the Upper Valley, and to accumulate thousands of acres of land in the region. In their outposts they sold basic supplies but also specialty items including "spelling books, silk, hats, “ozgn”, handkerchiefs, silver, and even a tailor-made suit," and acted as unofficial bankers. Their enterprise grew to involve an extensive Atlantic trade network, and included the buying and selling of convict servants from Britain, and a small number of African slaves. The brothers were among the "soul-drivers" in Virginia who bought convict servants wholesale from British transport ships at port, and traveled along established routes selling the convicts to farmers, planters, and others. Lodine-Chaffey suggests that the brothers' treatment of both convict servants and slaves was suspect, due to the frequency in which the servants and slaves escaped them; the brothers reported three slaves missing in 1769, and ten convicts missing in 1773. In total, their dealings in all ventures accounted for a "great share" of the trade in the region.

Mathews was appointed a justice of the peace for Augusta County in 1764, and in that role he presided over misdemeanors and other civil cases in the county. He also served as a member of the vestry for Augusta Parish around this time, with the vestry being the de facto local government for the county. Mathews was granted a liquor license in 1765, and his tavern and inn in Staunton, a "long frame building, a story and a half high, with dormer windows," soon became the most fashionable of its kind in Staunton. In 1768, Mathews became the guardian ad litem for a niece, Martha Mathews, on the premature death of her father, Joshua Mathews. She would later marry Thomas Posey, whose father had been a guest at Mathews' inn and probably arranged their meeting.

In 1773, Mathews and others solicited subscriptions for a new academy in the Valley. This academy, named Liberty Hall and located in Lexington, Virginia, was officially incorporated by the Commonwealth of Virginia in 1782, with Mathews serving as an original trustee. Liberty Hall was eventually renamed Washington and Lee University, and is the nation's ninth oldest institution of higher education.

In the fall of 1774, Royal Governor Lord Dunmore assembled a 1000-man invasion of Indian territory, culling recruits from Augusta County. Mathews' tavern served as headquarters for the local militia during preparations. A possibly apocryphal story arose that the men of George Mathews' regiment marked their height on a wall of Sampson Mathews' tavern, revealing that all but two men were over six feet tall. For the expedition, Mathews served as chief procurement officer for General Andrew Lewis, and oversaw the driving of 500 pack horses, 54,000 pounds of flour, and 108 cattle for the march from Augusta to Point Pleasant, for which the troops gave him the nickname "Master Driver of Cattle." An early Ohio historian said of Mathews' march:

His route lay wholly through a trackless forest. All his baggage, his provisions, and even his ammunition, had to be transported on pack-horses, that were clambering about among tall cliffs, or winding their way among dangerous defiles, ascending or descending the lofty summits of the Alleghenies. . . During nineteen entire days, this gallant band pressed forward descending from the height of the Allegheny mountains to the mouth of the Kenawha [sic], a distance of one hundred and sixty miles.

October 10, 1774, The Battle of Point Pleasant was fought between the Virginia militia and Indians from the Shawnee and Mingo tribes along the Ohio River. Various sources credit either Colonel Andrew Lewis or Captain George Mathews with a flanking maneuver that initiated Shawnee Chief Cornstalk's retreat and secured victory for the colonial militia.

== American Revolution ==
The months following the Dunmore's War saw tension rise between the British and the colonies. The Virginia House of Burgesses began to resist the Crown, and in retaliation Lord Dunmore dissolved it in May 1774. This lead the Burgesses to form the extralegal Virginia Conventions.

=== Revolutionary activities ===
On February 22, 1775, Mathews took part in the first documented revolutionary meeting in Augusta County, as a member of the county's Committee of Safety. These county committees were an outgrowth of the Virginia Committee of Correspondence, the state's patriotic shadow government. The Augusta County committee met in Staunton, Virginia, and drafted the Augusta Resolves to assert their county's commitment to "enjoy the free exercise of conscience, and of human nature." The committee then elected delegates to the Second Virginia Convention in March 1775, with Mathews among those who drafted instructions for the delegates. The Augusta Resolves were endorsed in a meeting of freeholders of Augusta County and published in Pinkney's March 16, 1775 Virginia Gazette. Historian Jim Glanville states that the resolutions of Virginia's four western counties (Augusta, Botetourt, Fincastle, and Pittsylvania) are best viewed as a whole and were "by far the most significant statements in favor of American liberty" of the county resolutions that preceded the Declaration of Independence.

Mathews, with two other representatives of the Augusta County committee, met with members of the counties of Albemarle, Amherst, and Buckingham in September 1775 to organize militia units in preparation for war against Britain. Augusta County resolved to raise four companies of fifty men each, with the other counties raising two companies of fifty men each. George Mathews was given command of the ten companies.

"It [the Augusta Declaration] is the first deliberate expression of the policy of establishing an independent state government and a permanent confederation of the States which our parliamentary journals contain. . .This memorial from Augusta . . .deserves to be stereotyped as the Magna Charta of the West."

— Hugh Blair Grigsby, Washington and Lee University Historical Papers, Volumes 1–2 (1890)

By the time of the Fifth Virginia Convention in May 1776, many its delegates knew the issue of independence would be addressed, and some came with prepared statements on the subject. However, over the first several sessions, the subject was postponed as the Convention dealt with other matters. On May 10, 1776, Thomas Lewis broached the independence issue when, on behalf of the Augusta County Committee of Safety, he introduced the Augusta Declaration to the Convention. Historian Hugh Blair Grigsby states that this is the first known official proposal for the creation of a permanent and independent union of states and national government from any of the Thirteen Colonies, and as such it "deserves to be stereotyped as the Magna Charta of the West" for its precedent in calling for this governmental mode, which was ultimately adopted in the creation of the United States of America. The Virginia Convention, responsive to the Augusta Declaration, passed proposals for independence, a confederation of colonies, and a national government on May 15 and forwarded them to the Second Continental Congress, which then initiated the drafting of the Declaration of Independence, the Articles of Confederation, and the Model Treaty.

=== Virginia State Senate and war efforts ===
Mathews was elected to the Virginia State Senate, the successor to the Virginia Governor's Council, for its inaugural session of 1776, representing Augusta and Dunmore counties. He remained a member of the state senate through 1780, representing Augusta, Rockingham, Rockbridge, and Shenandoah counties from 1778 to 1780.

Of the public rope-walks, manufactories of ducking, sail-cloth, etc, the most important was that at Warwick on the James, five miles south of Richmond. Skilled sail-makers were probably drawn from the Ulster settlement in the Valley of Virginia, some of whose members had doubtless served an apprenticeship in Ireland. The assignment of Col. Sampson Mathews, of August County, to a committee on the supervision of naval equipment is not without significance.

— Robert Armistead Stewart, The History of Virginia's Navy of the Revolution (1934).

During its inaugural session, the senate sought to improve the Continental Navy's Virginia fleet. At this time, Virginia had more land and manufactories devoted to naval purposes than any of the colonies, but it faced a distinct lack of materials needed to create linen sail cloth. Mathews, along with Alexander St. Clair, was therefore appointed to erect and superintend a factory in Staunton, Virginia to make sail material from flax grown by Augusta County farmers.

However, other matters soon drew Mathews elsewhere. In the fall of 1777, Shawnee Chief Cornstalk made a diplomatic visit to the American Fort Randolph, on the site present-day Point Pleasant, West Virginia. Virginia militiamen took Cornstalk hostage at the fort, and on November 10, 1777, killed him without cause. This led to an immediate backlash from the Shawnee. Congress, sensing the urgency of the situation, passed a resolution on November 20 to send commissioners out west with the aim of restoring friendly relations between the Shawnee and the colonists that had been years in the making. Mathews was appointed to represent Virginia, and George Clymer for Pennsylvania. The men arrived at Fort Pitt in mid-March, and reported back to Congress in late-April that the British in Detroit were aiding the Shawnee and nearby Delaware tribes in their attacks. Further, they believed the colonists may well be able to restore friendly relations with the Indians by capturing Fort Detroit from the British, and thus weakening the Indians' position. They proposed a force of 3,000 be dedicated to this cause. Congress, however, deferred the recommendation, considering it too costly, and instead sent troops to fortify their western borders.

=== Military service ===
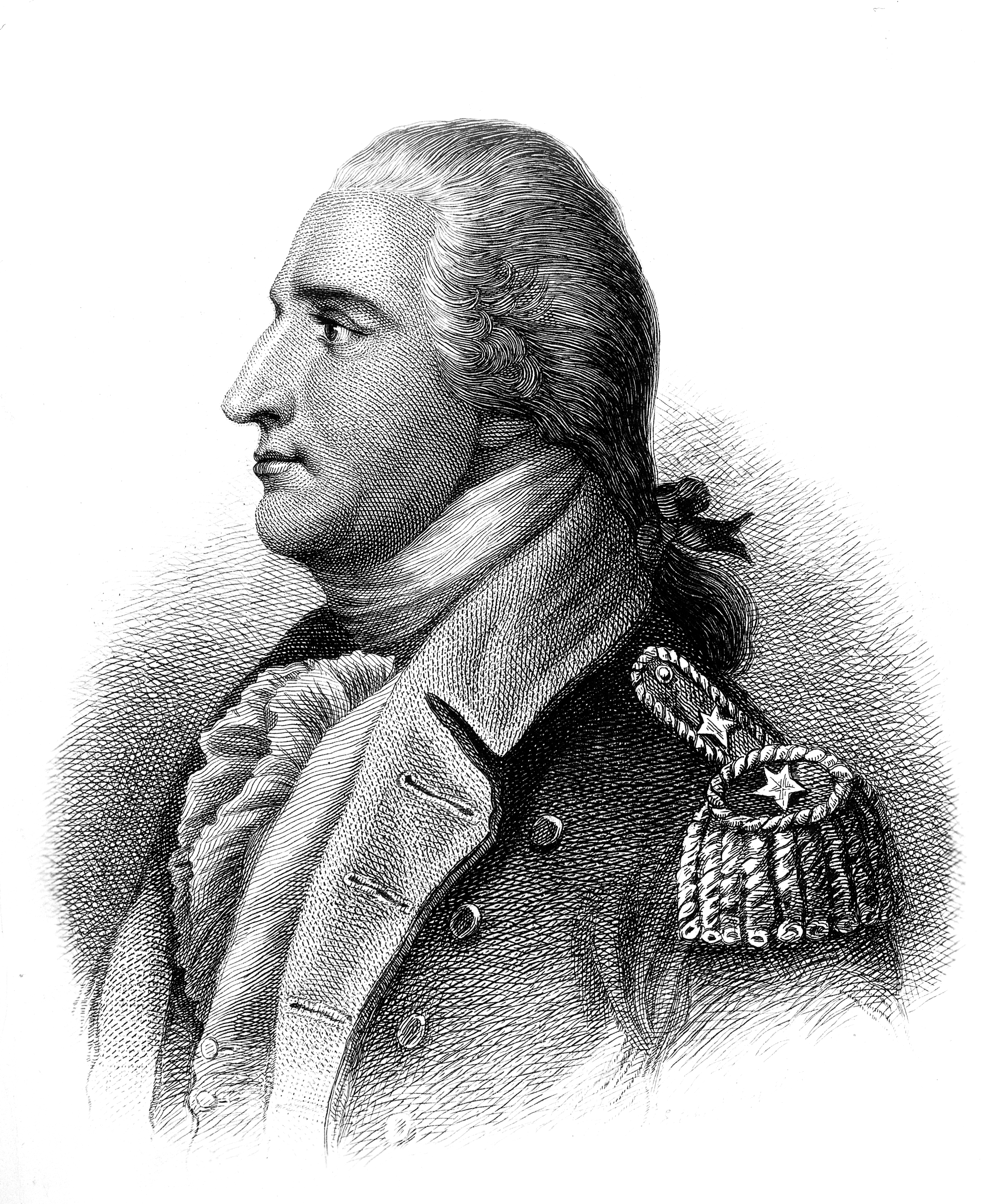
British Brigadier General Benedict Arnold invaded Virginia by surprise in 1781.

Mathews was appointed lieutenant colonel of Augusta County militia in May 1778, giving him command of the county militia and a field commission of colonel. This was a position normally given to the most prominent leader of the county. Mathews called out the militia for a three month expedition in April 1779, on account of Indian threats in Tygart Valley, Virginia. The expedition resulted in several scouting missions, but no battle. In October 1780, Mathews requested leave from the Virginia State Senate.

On January 1, 1781, British Brigadier General Benedict Arnold launched a surprise invasion of Virginia. For five days he sailed up the James River to virtually no resistance. Virginia Governor Thomas Jefferson fled the capitol of Richmond as Arnold approached, and Arnold's forces thereafter burned and looted the city. Jefferson called out militia commanders throughout the state to help to repel the invasion. He directed Mathews to march to Fredericksburg, and report to Brigadier General George Weedon. Mathews wrote to the governor the next day, confirming that he and a company of 250 would head to Fredericksburg in the morning. Mathews also recruited his son-in-law Major Thomas Posey to join him with his troops for the march.

Mathews made the approximately 100 mile march from Staunton to Fredericksburg in four days. After spending an additional four days in Fredericksburg, Mathews was directed by Major General Peter Muhlenberg to turn to Bowling Green about 30 miles south. There Mathews wrote to Jefferson urging that he make materials available "for the repair of the arms of the militia." Muhlenberg then directed Mathews to Cabin Point in Smithfield, Virginia, some 80 miles southeast to the mouth of the James. Mathews wrote to Jefferson on the 29th that his march had been delayed at the James River for several days due to poor weather and insufficiency of the transport boats. He described the lack of basic provisions in his camp, including tents and ammunition, and the poor health of many from exposure to the winter elements, which lead him to fear mutiny.

Jefferson responded on the 31st, relaying that there were some 150 tents "somewhere," and that he would attempt locate and direct them toward Mathews, acknowledging that Mathews' position "nearest the enemy's lines" validated the expediency of these supplies. By February 15, the Virginia militia had bottled up Arnold's forces in Portsmouth, Virginia, with Mathews commanding the advanced post alongside 350 riflemen. Nothing else is known of the Mathews' regiment during this expedition, and the Augusta County militia returned home in mid-April.

The Virginia General Assembly, having fled Arnold's force in Richmond, met in the Trinity Episcopal Church in Staunton, Virginia from June 7 to 23. On June 12, the Assembly voted to elect Thomas Nelson Jr. as the 4th governor of Virginia. Mathews, who remained a justice of the peace for Augusta County, administered the oath of office to Nelson the following week, on June 19. Mathews quickly left again for eastern Virginia, bringing a regiment to James City, Virginia where it saw action in the Battle of Green Spring. Mathews' field lieutenant colonel, William Boyer, was captured during the battle. On August 8, Mathews went to Yorktown, Virginia, where the siege of Yorktown proved to be the last major battle of the war. By November 1781 Mathews had returned from battle and resumed his duties in the Virginia State Senate, being appointed to the Privy Council on November 30. Mathews stepped down as lieutenant colonel of Augusta County militia on November 18, 1783.

== Later life ==
Mathews served a final term in the Virginia State Senate in 1790, representing Augusta, Rockingham, Rockbridge, Shenandoah, and Pendleton counties. He then served as a justice of the peace and the first high sheriff of Bath County when it was formed from Augusta County in 1791. He also served as an original trustee for Hot Springs, Virginia on its formation in 1793. He lived in Bath County about ten years at his estate, Cloverdale. On the death of his wife Mary, he married again to a Mary Warwick. He resided in Staunton, Virginia in later life, in a log house at the intersection of Beverly and Water Streets. He died in Staunton in 1807.

Mathews' son, Sampson Mathews II, served as a Virginia Delegate from Bath County for the 1809–1810 session of the Virginia General Assembly, representing the Federalist Party.

== Bibliography ==
- Chalkley, Lyman (1912). Chronicles of the Scotch-Irish Settlement in Virginia. Rosslyn, Virginia: The Commonwealth printing co. OCLC 2575649.
- Grigsby, Hugh Blair (1890). Washington and Lee University Historical Papers, Volumes 1–2. Lexington, Virginia: The New York Public Library. p. 88.
- Henning, William W. (1809). The Statutes at Large: Being a Collection of all the Laws of Virginia, vol. 7. New York City: R. & W. & G. Bartow. OCLC 426084215.
- McCallister, J.T. (1913). Virginia militia in the Revolutionary War : McAllister's data. Hot Springs, Virginia: McCallister Publishing Co. OCLC 1536303.
- McCleskey, N. Turk (1990). Across the first divide: Frontiers of settlement and culture in Augusta County, Virginia, 1738-1770 (PhD). College of William & Mary. doi:10.21220/s2-6p40-zt04.
- Morton, Oren (1978). Annals of Bath County, Virginia. Harrisonburg, Virginia: C.J. Carrier Co. OCLC 656749557.
- Peyton, John L. (1882). History of Augusta County, Virginia. Unknown: Samuel M. Yost & son. ISBN 1230356312. OCLC 923774044.
- Tillson, Jr., Albert (1991). Gentry and Common Folk: Political Culture on a Virginia Frontier 1740–1789. Lexington, KY: The University Press of Kentucky. ISBN 9780813155173.
- Waddell, Joseph A. (1902). Annals of Augusta County, Virginia, from 1726 to 1871. Staunton, Virginia: C. R. Caldwell. OCLC 3880311.
- Waddell, Joseph A. (1902). Annals of Augusta County, Virginia, from 1726 to 1871: Supplement. Staunton, Virginia: C. R. Caldwell. OCLC 3880311.
