= John Mathews (American pioneer) =

American colonial pioneer (??–1757)

Personal details
- Died: 1757 Augusta County, Virginia, British America
- Spouse: Ann Archer
- Children: Eleven, including: Sampson Mathews; George Mathews; Archer Mathews
- Relatives: Mathews family
- Occupation: Public officer; militia officer; farmer

Military service
- Allegiance: (Kingdom of Great Britain) Great Britain
- Branch/service: Virginia provincial militia
- Rank: Captain
- Battles/wars: French and Indian War; Braddock Expedition

John Mathews (died 1757) was an early American pioneer in Augusta County, Virginia, where he served as an officer in the county militia, a vestryman for Augusta Parish, and a justice of the peace. He was the progenitor of the Mathews political family from Virginia and the American South.

== Origin ==
John Mathews likely immigrated to Pennsylvania from County Armagh, Northern Ireland around 1730, with the family of his wife, Ann (Archer) Mathews, which was from neighboring County Tyrone, and from there migrated to the Valley of Virginia. Beyond this, evidence of Mathews' activity in Europe before his immigration is scarce; he or his family may have lived near the town of Markethill in County Armagh. Mathews arrived in the Valley of Virginia around 1737, before the establishment of Augusta County, Virginia. Many sources identify him as of Scotch-Irish ancestry, with others specifying that he or his descendants were of Welsh or English ancestry.

An 1869 London publication states that a branch of a prominent Welsh Mathew family "still exists in the north-west of Ireland," leading some to suggest that John Mathews of Augusta County, Virginia was a relative of this family through a Theobald Mathew (d. 1699), whose father George Mathew moved from Radyr, Wales to Thurles, County Tipperary, Ireland in 1625. Others have claimed that John Mathews descended from the same Welsh Mathew family, but through different branches. A great-grandson of John Mathews, James Hervey Otey, stated in his journal that his mother, a granddaughter of John Mathews, was a descendant of Tobias Matthew (1546–1628), an archbishop of York in the Church of England. Yet another source indicates that John Mathews was the son of British admiral Thomas Mathews. None of these connections have been professionally corroborated.

== Settlement ==
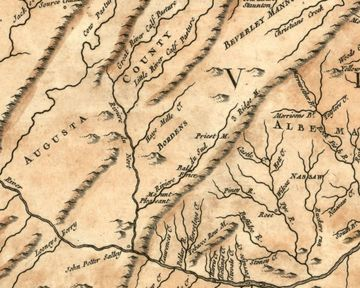
Map of Borden's Tract, Augusta County, Virginia, circa 1757. Mathews owned land in and around this tract.

John Mathews settled in Augusta County, Virginia, in what is present-day Rockbridge County, around 1737. At this time, Augusta County was a sparsely populated frontier county with an indefinite western boundary. The Colonial Virginia government sought to develop "buffer settlements of European Protestants" to protect the interior of the colony from Indian conflict and prevent French expansion eastward, among other reasons. In pursuit of this aim, the State granted large amounts of land and delegated authority to a select few early settlers of the region, who quickly formed a frontier elite and fashioned a conservative, hierarchical society which closely mirrored those of eastern Virginia.

Mathews settled first in a 92,100-acre tract granted by the Virginia Governor's Council to land speculator Benjamin Borden, who recruited immigrants from the Scotch-Irish immigration. When new land opened to for settlement in the upper valley to the south of Borden's tract, Mathews made a rush for these lands and in 1739 received a grant for 1,600 acres, which placed him among the top freeholders in the county by acreage. Only thirteen men owned more than 1000 acres in 1745, at a time when approximately two-thirds of eligible white men owned no land at all. Mathews' tract was located in the valley of Mill Creek, a tributary of Buffalo Creek in the Forks of the James neighborhood. Of an oblong diamond shape three miles long and a half mile wide in the middle, this tract extended near present-day Buffalo Forge to the north and Hickory Hill to the south; the Falling Springs Presbyterian Church is now located on this site. Here Mathews built a log "Manor House" for his family and remained for life. Over ensuing years, he bought and sold numerous landholdings and made improvements to his lands. In 1748, he was identified in county records as a yeoman farmer, but by 1750 he was recognized as a gentleman, or a member of the landed gentry of colonial Virginia.

== Military service ==
In 1742, Mathews served as a captain of Augusta County militia. At this time, the Six Nations Iroquois Confederacy, finding the white settlers of western Pennsylvania and Virginia to be in violation of the 1722 Treaty of Albany, launched numerous offensives against the frontier communities, resulting in significant losses to life and property of Augusta County settlers. Such activity would continue over the years, often during winter, when food and supplies were relatively scarce. Mathews cited "losses by Indians" in the winter of 1745. When the French and Indian War broke out in 1755, up to five of Mathews' sons served in the Braddock's Expedition to capture the French Fort Duquesne and halt French and Indian advances into the British settlement, while the senior Mathews provided provisions for the expedition. The result was a decisive defeat for the British; of the approximately 1,300 men Braddock led into battle, 456 were killed and 422 wounded, with Braddock among the dead. The loss left the Augusta County frontier exposed to Indian attack. The following year, 1756, Mathews served as a captain of infantry for the Augusta County militia.

== Religious role ==
In 1746, in what was the first election held in the county, Mathews and eleven other men were elected to the vestry of the Anglican Church for Augusta Parish. At this time in Virginia, vestrymen, though ecclesiastic officials, were de facto public officers who represented the entirety of the local government, While Mathews and his sons identified with the Anglican church, most of the elected vestrymen were Presbyterian. Of the twelve vestrymen, Mathews was one of only four who identified as Anglican. Despite being a numerical minority, the Anglican coalition shaped early religious life in the county and formed an alliance with its Presbyterian counterpart. The vestry was responsible for the processioning of lands, issuing levies, providing for parish expenses, tending to the poor, and other local administrative needs. Vestrymen also served as churchwardens for the parish, and in this role were responsible for the upkeep of public morals. Mathews either provided his home or built a separate structure on his property to serve as a chapel of ease for the Anglican congregation. In his will he left ten dollars to the poor of Augusta Parish.

== Judicial and civil responsibilities ==
Mathews was recommended justice of the peace of the Magistrate's Court for Augusta County in 1746, and had qualified by the fall of 1751. This was the most authoritative position in the county, and was typically held by the county's largest landholders. In this role, he issued warrants and reviewed arrests.

Mathews also acted as an overseer of early road construction efforts in the county, including, in 1753, a road in the North Forks of the James River, for which forty-five workers were employed, and another, presumably smaller road, begun in 1754, for which three men were employed.

== Family ==
John Mathews married Ann Archer, a Scotch-Irish immigrant. They had eleven children: John, Joshua, Richard, Sampson, George, William, Archer, Jane, Anna, Rachel, and Elizabeth. Mathews' eldest son, John, was murdered along with his family in their home in 1763. A relative of Joshua Mathews later deeded this land to the trustees of the Falling Springs Presbyterian Church, which now stands on this site. Four of Mathews' sons served in public office in the State of Virginia: Sampson, George, and Archer Mathews were elected to the Virginia General Assembly, and William Mathews was a justice of the peace in his locality. George Mathews additionally served as a governor of Georgia and a US Representative to the First Congress.

Other notable descendants of John Mathews include George Mathews Jr. (1774–1836); Presiding Judge of the Louisiana Supreme Court, Henry M. Mathews (1834–1884); 5th Governor of West Virginia, Mason Mathews Patrick (1863–1942); Chief of U.S. Army Air Service/Corps

== Bibliography ==
- Atkinson, George Wesley; Gibbens, Alvaro Franklin (1890). Prominent Men of West Virginia: Biographical Sketches of Representative Men in Every Honorable Vocation, Including Politics, the Law, Theology, Medicine, Education, Finance, Journalism, Trade, Commerce and Agriculture. Wheeling, West Virginia: W. L. Callin. OCLC 3886825.
- Bolton, Charles, Knowles (1910). Scotch Irish pioneers in Ulster and America. Boston, Massachusetts: Bacon and Brown. OCLC 936201434.
- Boots, John R. (1970). The Mat(t)hews family : an anthology of Matthews lineages. Ocala, Florida: Unknown. OCLC 866386615.
- Callahan, James (1923). The History of West Virginia, Old and New, Volume II, pgs. 8. Chicago and New York: The American Historical Society, Inc. OCLC 42346040.
- Chalkley, Lyman (1912). Chronicles of the Scotch-Irish Settlement in Virginia. Rosslyn, Virginia: The Commonwealth printing co. OCLC 2575649.
- Chalkley, Lyman (1989). Chronicles of the Scotch-Irish Settlement in Virginia, volume 3. Rosslyn, Virginia: The Commonwealth printing co. OCLC 704901711.
- Cole, J.R. (1917). History of Greenbrier County. Lewisburg, West Virginia: C. R. Caldwell. OCLC 874926102.
- Dorman, John F. (2007). Adventurers of Purse and Person, Virginia, 1607-1624/5: Families G-P. Baltimore, Maryland: Genealogical Pub. Co. ISBN 9780806318196. OCLC 844965054.
- Ebel, Carol (2014). George Mathews (1739-1812).
- Eshelman, Henry F. (1917). Historic Background and Annals of the Swiss and German Pioneer Settlers of Southeastern Pennsylvania. Lancaster, Pennsylvania: Unknown. OCLC 1020458368.
- Feamster, C. N. (1938). "Capt. John Mathews Descendants Prominent; A Rockbridge Family Rockbridge County, Virginia Bi-Centennial 1738-1938, Section Five". Rockbridge County, Virginia.
- Henning, William W. (180). The Statutes at Large: Being a Collection of all the Laws of Virginia, vol. 7. New York City: R. & W. & G. Bartow. OCLC 426084215.
- Kegley, Frederick (1938). Kegley's Virginia Frontier:the beginning of the Southwest; the Roanoke of colonial days, 1740-1783. Roanoke, Virginia: Southwest Virginia Historical Society. OCLC 574856025.
- Kromkowski, C. (2005). "Virginia Elections and State Elected Officials Database Project, 1776 – 2005". Charlottesville, Virginia: University of Virginia Library.
- McCleskey, N. Turk (1990). Across the first divide: Frontiers of settlement and culture in Augusta County, Virginia, 1738-1770 (PhD). College of William & Mary. doi:10.21220/s2-6p40-zt04.
- Morton, Oren (1978). Annals of Bath County, Virginia. Harrisonburg, Virginia: C.J. Carrier Co. OCLC 656749557.
- Morton, Oren (1920). A History of Rockbridge County, Virginia. The McClure Co. p. 176. OCLC 971999830.
- Notes and Queries: A Medium of Enter-Communication for Literary Men, General Readers, Etc. (Fourth series, Volume Four). London, England: Office, 43 Wellington Street, Strand, W.C. 1869. OCLC 611217138.
- Otey, James Hervey (1994). Otey's journal : being the account by James Hervey Otey, A.B., M.A., D.D., L.L.D., first bishop of the Tennessee Diocese of the Protestant Episcopal Church, of his travels in the summer of 1851 in England, Scotland, Ireland, and Wales. Unknown: Overmountain Press. ISBN 1570720096. OCLC 30797045.
- Peyton, John L. History of Augusta County, Virginia. Unknown: Samuel M. Yost & son. ISBN 1230356312. OCLC 923774044.
- Stephen, Leslie (2007). Dictionary of National Biography, vol. 37. Great Britain: Unknown. OCLC 1042961536.
- Waddel, Joseph A. (1902). Annals of Augusta County, Virginia, from 1726 to 1871. Staunton, Virginia: C. R. Caldwell. OCLC 3880311.
