= Adam Clarke Snyder =

American judge (1834–1896)

Justice of the Supreme Court of West Virginia
- In office Jun. 1, 1882 – Nov. 8, 1890
- Preceded by: James F. Patton
- Succeeded by: Homer A. Holt

Personal details
- Born: March 26, 1834 Highland County, Virginia
- Died: July 24, 1896 (aged 62) Lewisburg, West Virginia
- Party: Democratic
- Spouse: Henrietta Cary Mathews
- Education: Washington College (Washington and Lee University)

Adam Clarke Snyder (March 26, 1834 – July 24, 1896) was a justice of the West Virginia Supreme Court.

== Biography ==
Snyder was educated at Washington College (now Washington and Lee University) in Lexington, Virginia. He received a degree in law at the Lexington Law School. He married Henrietta Cary.

When the Civil War broke, he served with the 27th Virginia Volunteer Infantry (known as the 'Greenbrier Rifles') in the Confederate States Army, returning to his profession at law when the war was ended.

Snyder was a co-founder of the Bank of Lewisburg with Alexander F. Mathews and Homer A. Holt. The bank opened in 1781 and was the first official bank in the county. In 1882 he was appointed to the Supreme Court of West Virginia to complete the term of Justice James F. Patton, who died in office. In 1884, Snyder was elected for the next full term, serving until 1890. He died in Lewisburg in 1896.
