= Mason Mathews =

American politician (1803–1878)

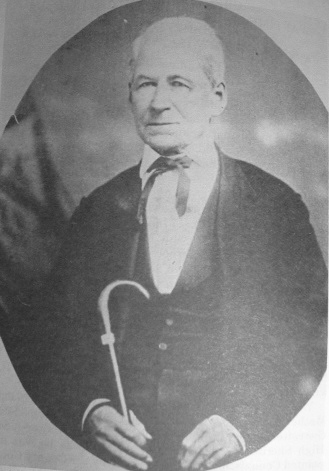

Member of the Virginia House of Delegates from the Greenbrier district
- In office 1859–1865
- Preceded by: Thomas Creigh
- Succeeded by: Seat abolished

Personal details
- Born: December 15, 1803 Lewisburg, Virginia (now West Virginia)
- Died: September 16, 1878 (aged 74) Lewisburg, West Virginia
- Resting place: Old Stone Church, Lewisburg, West Virginia
- Party: Whig
- Spouse: Eliza Shore Reynolds
- Children: Eight, including: Henry Mason Mathews; Alexander Ferdinand Mathews
- Parents: Joseph Mathews (father); Mary "Polly" Edgar (mother)
- Relatives: Mathews family
- Committees: Committee on Claims; Joint Commission on Executive Expenditures; Treasurer's Account

Mason Mathews (December 15, 1803 – September 16, 1878) was an American merchant and politician in the U.S. State of Virginia (present-day West Virginia). He served in the Virginia House of Delegates, representing Greenbrier County from 1859–1865 as a Whig. This period included the secession of Virginia and the resulting American Civil War of 1861–1865. Though Mathews opposed secession, he chose to support the Confederate States of America when Virginia seceded. Throughout the war, much of his efforts were directed toward the Confederate defense of western Virginia. When his home of Greenbrier County was taken into the new State of West Virginia in 1863, he continued to represent Greenbrier County in Virginia's Confederate legislature in Richmond until war's end. He was a member of the Mathews political family.

== Early life and business ==
Mason Mathews was born on December 15, 1803, in Lewisburg, Greenbrier County, Virginia, to Mary Edgar and Joseph Mathews. His family was politically prominent in western Virginia. One of his great-uncles, Archer Mathews, served as an original trustee of the City of Lewisburg when it was founded in 1782. Mason Mathews's father bought an early lot in the city, and moved his family from Augusta County (present-day Rockbridge County) to Lewisburg in the 1790s.

Mason Mathews was primarily homeschooled by his mother. He was a boy when his father died, and he found work as a local store clerk to support his family. On September 27, 1827, Mathews, at age 24, married Eliza Shore Reynolds, the 19-year-old daughter of Thomas Byrd Reynolds and Sally Ann McDowell. They had eight children: Mary Edgar, Sally Ann, Henry Mason, Virginia Amanda, Alexander Ferdinand, Joseph William, Eliza Thomas, and Sally Patton.

Around 1827, Mathews moved to Frankford, Virginia (now West Virginia), where he established a successful mercantile business. Beginning in 1845, he resided at 1335 Washington Street East, in Lewisburg, West Virginia. He sent his three sons to be educated at the University of Virginia. In 1860, he owned 10 slaves.

== Political career ==
=== Local offices ===
Mathews was elected sheriff of Greenbrier County around 1825, under High Sheriff James Andrews. He resigned the office in 1828, and in 1830, at the age of 27, was appointed by the Greenbrier County Court to the office of Commissioner of the Revenue for Greenbrier County's lower district, being also appointed to the upper district in 1832. He additionally served as a justice of the peace for the city of Frankford, and again in Lewisburg, from about 1834 to 1850, at which point the state judicial system was overhauled by the Virginia Constitutional Convention of 1850. He additionally served as the treasurer of the Board of Commissioners of Free Schools, which raised and deployed funding for the education of poor children in the absence of a public school system.

=== Virginia House of Delegates ===
In 1859, Mathews was elected to the Virginia House of Delegates for Greenbrier County as a representative of the Whig Party. In the 1860 presidential election, Republican Abraham Lincoln won the presidency over Democrat John C. Breckinridge. As a result, Southerners began to discuss secession in earnest. Mathews, like many western Virginians, opposed secession; on April 11, 1861, Mathews wrote to a local newspaper, "I am in favor of the preservation of our glorious Union, and a resort to all Constitutional remedies for its restoration. Next to my Bible, I reverence [the] Constitution of my Country & the Union." However, on April 17, Virginia's Ordinance of Secession passed. Mathews, along with Greenbrier County, chose to support the Confederate States of America.

Unionists from northwestern Virginia soon met at the Wheeling Convention to establish the Restored Government of Virginia, which would function as Virginia's official Union government. Greenbrier County, which had not sent a representative to Wheeling, nevertheless fell under the Restored Government's jurisdiction. This area became the State of West Virginia in June 1863. Mathews chose to ignore the new state, and though he found himself living in Union territory, continued to travel to Richmond, Virginia to represent his county in the Confederate Virginia House of Delegates, where he kept his seat throughout the war.

In the House, Mathews served on several standing committees related to state fiscal policy. These included the Committee on Claims, which generally dealt with issues related to private bills and petitions, and the Joint Commission on Executive Expenditures, from which body he submitted legislation supporting the families of soldiers injured in the war, and advocated for improved infrastructure in western Virginia by means of an extended Covington and Ohio Railroad. He also was tasked with examining the state Treasurer's accounts.

== Civil War ==
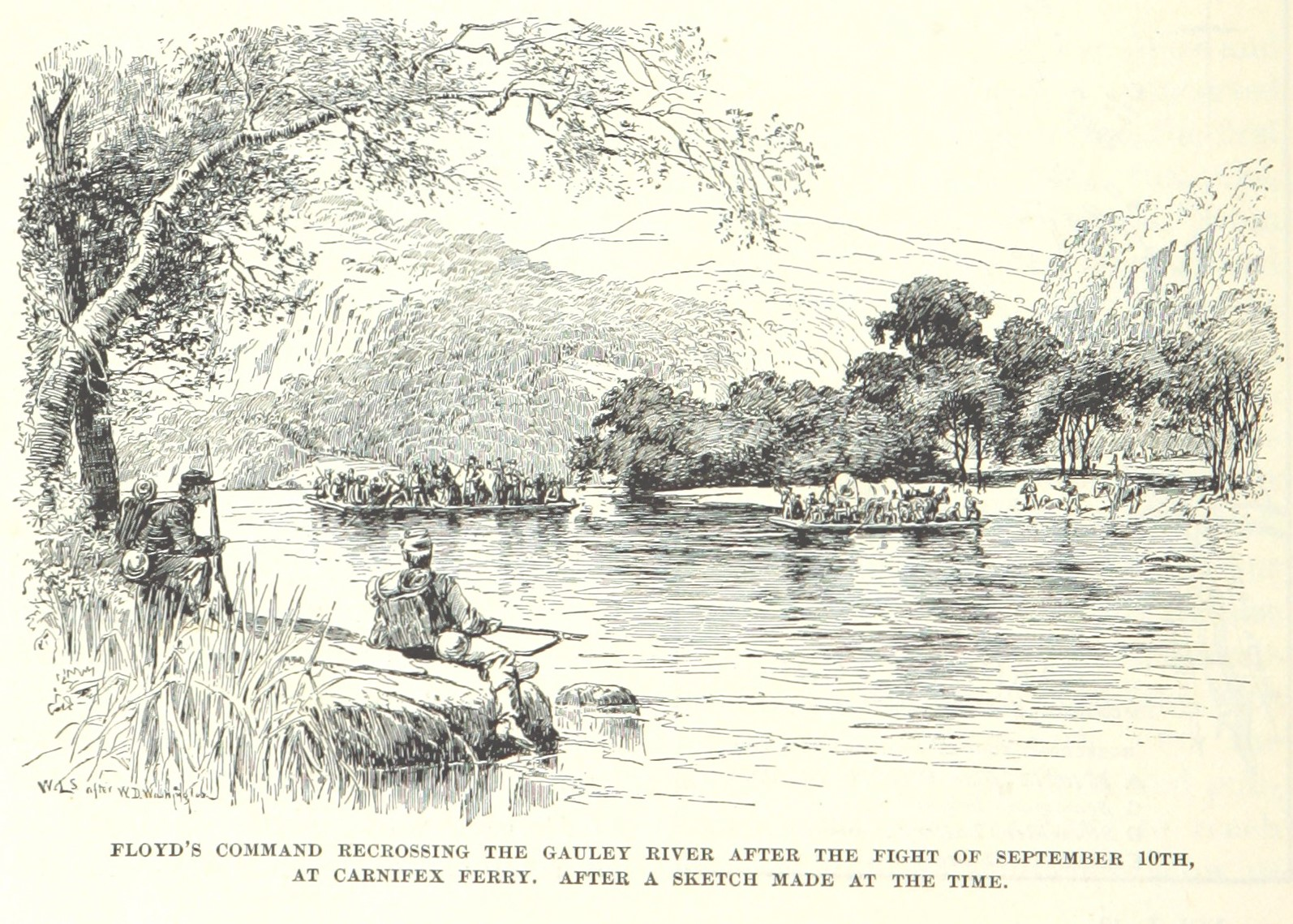
General Floyd's retreat after Carnifex Ferry. The Confederate loss led to a public feud between him and fellow general Henry A. Wise, which Mason Mathews arbitrated.

On the outbreak of war, Mathews' sons volunteered for the Confederate States Army, where each ultimately received an officer commission. One son, Alexander F. Mathews was assigned to the brigade of General Henry A. Wise in the Western Virginia Campaign. The brigade saw action at the Battle of Carnifex Ferry, where Wise and his co-commander, general John B. Floyd, engaged Union troops under General William S. Rosecrans. The battle was a strategic win for the Union, causing the Confederates to withdraw from the northwestern Virginia region. Generals Wise and Floyd each blamed the other for the loss, resulting in significant discord in the ranks and negative attention from newspapers.

Mathews, to assess the urgency of the situation, spent several days in the camps of both Wise and Floyd, and then wrote to Confederate President Jefferson Davis urging that both men be deposed, stating, "They are as inimical to each other as men could be, and from their course of actions I am fully satisfied that each of them would be highly gratified to see the other annihilated." Letters from Mathews and others, as well as the correspondence from the generals themselves, moved Davis to address the rift between the generals, which at this point had spread throughout their respective camps. Davis removed Wise from his command.

The 1862 Battle of Lewisburg, another Confederate loss, further destabilized the region. Union occupations and raiding of Lewisburg followed, including the raiding of one of Mathews' properties during the fall of 1863. In a letter to a son, he recalled, "[t]hey appropriated everything they wished when they went, many fared worse than I did. I think we ought to be thankful that they treated us no worse." He cited the loss of farming equipment, a vehicle, a horse, livestock, material goods, and a formerly enslaved person named Ned, who likely left with the Union troops.

== Later life ==
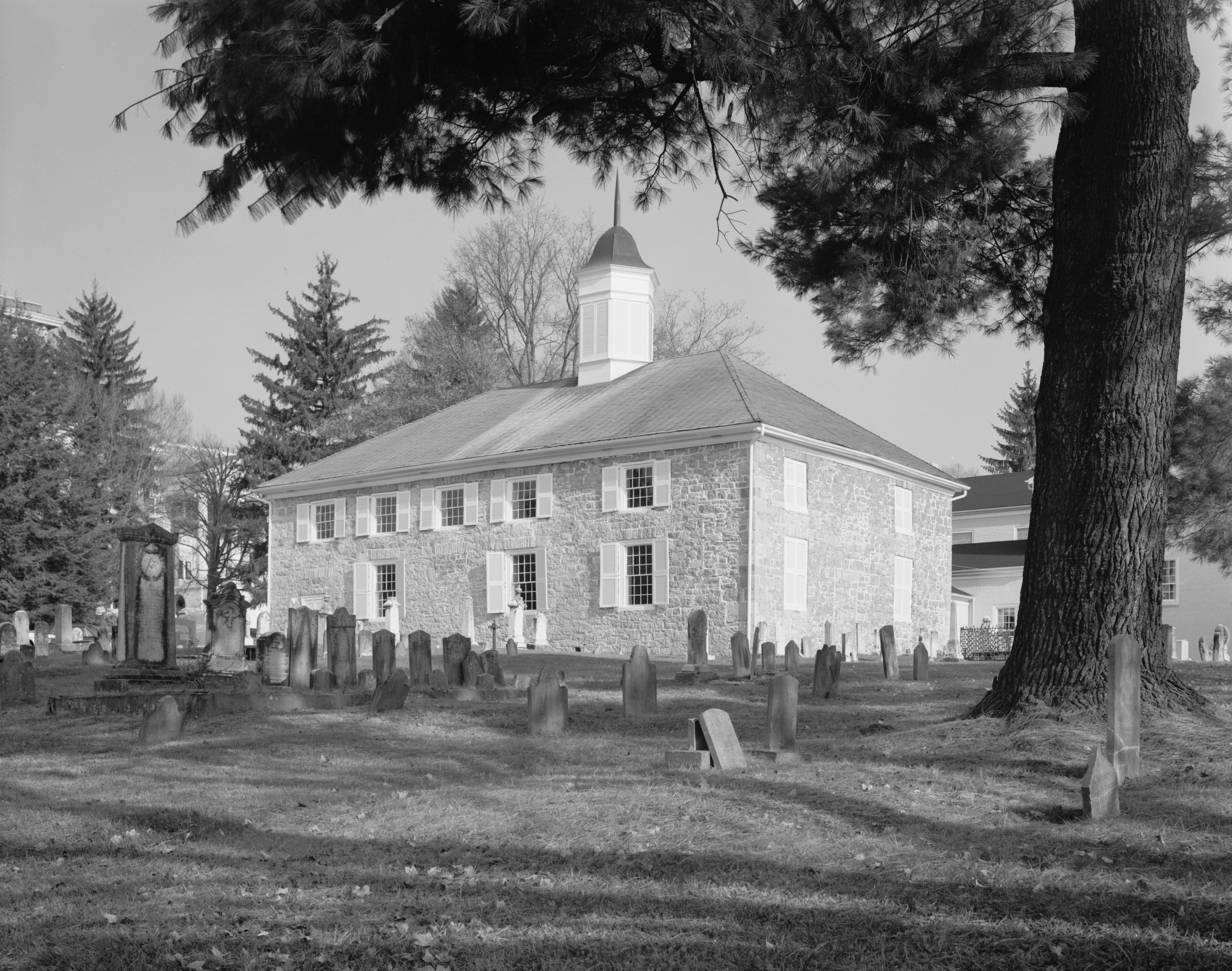
Mathews' gravesite, Old Stone Church, Lewisburg, West Virginia

When the Confederacy dissolved, all other Confederate soldiers and office holders were barred from holding state office. Mathews' eldest son, Henry M. Mathews, was elected to the West Virginia Senate in 1865, but was unable to take his seat due to these restrictions. When the restrictions were overturned, the younger Mathews would go on to become the 7th attorney general of West Virginia and 5th governor of West Virginia. Mason Mathews died of pneumonia at his home in Lewisburg on September 16, 1878, at the age of 74, and was buried at the Old Stone Church in Lewisburg, West Virginia.

Mathews' daughter, Virginia Amanda Mathews, married Alfred S. Patrick in 1863. Their son Mason Mathews Patrick was the Chief of the US Air Service, AEF during World War I, and again during the Interwar period of 1921-1926. In 1926 he drafted the Congressional bill that created the US Air Corps from the Air Service, and he served as the first Chief of the Air Corps from 1926-1927.

== Bibliography ==
- Addkison-Simmons, Donna (2010). Henry Mason Mathews. e-WV: The West Virginia Encyclopedia.
- Atkinson, George Wesley (1919). Bench and Bar of West Virginia. Charleston, West Virginia: Virginia Law Book Company. OCLC 8899470.
- Atkinson, George Wesley; Gibbens, Alvaro Franklin (1890). Prominent Men of West Virginia: Biographical Sketches of Representative Men in Every Honorable Vocation, Including Politics, the Law, Theology, Medicine, Education, Finance, Journalism, Trade, Commerce and Agriculture. Wheeling, West Virginia: W. L. Callin. OCLC 3886825.
- Callahan, James (1923). The History of West Virginia, Old and New, Volume II, pgs. 7-9. Chicago and New York: The American Historical Society, Inc. OCLC 42346040.
- Combs, James Thurl (1987). Greenbrier, C.S.A. Wartime Letters of Mason Mathews to his son Captain Joseph William Mathews, C.S.A., p. 5–44. Parsons, West Virginia: The Journal of the Greenbrier Historical Society. OCLC 13983198.
- Rice, Otis K. (1986). A History of Greenbrier County. Lewisburg, West Virginia: Greenbrier Historical Society. ISBN 0961750502. OCLC 15539717.
