= Alexander Mathews =

Alexander Mathews may refer to:

- Alexander Mathews (priest) (1840–1895), Archdeacon of Mauritius
- Alexander F. Mathews (1838–1906), American businessman and banker
