= John Mathews (clerk) =

American politician

Clerk of Court for Greenbrier County, Virginia (now West Virginia)
- In office 1831–1849

Virginia House of Delegates
- In office 1798–1802

Personal details
- Born: October 30, 1768
- Died: November 1849 (aged 81) Greenbrier County, Virginia (now West Virginia)
- Spouse: Catherine Cary
- Relations: Mathews family
- Occupation: surveyor, politician, and lawyer

John Mathews (October 30, 1768 – November 1849) was a 19th-century American surveyor, politician and lawyer. A Federalist, he was a member of the Virginia House of Delegates from Greenbrier County from 1798 to 1802, also serving as clerk of court for Greenbrier County from 1831 to 1849.

== Life ==
John Mathews was born on October 30, 1768, in Rockbridge County, Virginia, to Frances Crowe and William Mathews. His father, who was justice of the peace for Botetourt County, Virginia, died when John Mathews was aged 4. He and a brother, Joseph Mathews, moved to Greenbrier County and settled in Lewisburg, Virginia (now West Virginia), when it was created by the Virginia General Assembly in 1782. John Mathews' uncle, Archer Mathews, was a founding trustee of Lewisburg, along with Colonel John Stuart. In his early life, John Mathews worked as a surveyor for John Stuart in Lewisburg.

In 1798 Mathews was elected to the Virginia House of Delegates from Greenbrier County. A Federalist, he was a staunch opponent to the Democratic-Republican Virginia Resolutions authored by James Madison, which were passed in 1798 order to give states the right and the duty to declare unconstitutional any acts of the United States Congress that were not authorized by the Constitution. The Resolutions, written in secret, were largely a response to the 1798 federal Alien and Sedition Acts which raised residency requirements for United States citizenship from 5 to 14 years and authorized the President to deport aliens, and permitted their arrest, imprisonment, and deportation during wartime. When the resolutions passed, the Greenbrier County was one of ten counties to oppose the acts, and its court was said to have displayed disapproval by "tearing them into pieces and trampling them underfoot."

In 1829 Mathews was appointed treasurer of the Lewisburg Bible society, which procured bibles for impoverished county residents. In 1831 he was appointed commissioner of the James River and Kanawa Company for Greenbrier County, when the company was created from the James River Company. From this position he was responsible for securing regional funds for the building of a canal that was to connect trade from Richmond, Virginia ports to Buchanan, Virginia, 195 miles to the west. In 1835, construction of the James River and Kanawha Canal resumed under Chief Engineer Benjamin Wright.

Also in 1831 Mathews was elected clerk of court for Greenbrier County, and in that position he remained until his death in November, 1849.
