= Matthew Arbuckle Sr. =

- Born: July 15, 1740; Botetourt County, Virginia
- Died: July 27, 1781 (aged 41); Jackson River, Virginia
- Occupations: Hunter, fur trapper, militia officer, magistrate
- Spouse: Frances Lawrence Arbuckle Hunter Welch

Matthew Arbuckle Sr., (July 15, 1740 – July 27, 1781) was a frontiersman, hunter and fur trapper of western Virginia (now West Virginia) and the Ohio territory. He is considered likely to have been the first Euro-American person to travel through Virginia all the way to the Ohio River, other than as a prisoner of Native Americans. This trapping and trading trip may have occurred around 1764.

== Biography ==
Arbuckle was born in Augusta (now Botetourt) County, Virginia. He served in the Augusta County militia in 1758 and '59. He was the first white man to travel the length of the "Great Kanawha" valley and records indicate that he reached the future site of Point Pleasant, at the confluence of the Kanawha and Ohio Rivers, around 1764. By 1767 he is listed as a lieutenant and in 1770 he was commissioned captain of (the newly formed) Botetourt County militia. He served as a "gentleman justice" of Botetourt County from its founding in 1769 until 1773. In 1774, he built the stockade on Muddy Creek, Greenbrier County, now known as Arbuckle's Old Fort.

After the outbreak of Lord Dunmore's War in May 1774, Arbuckle both assumed command of a company of Botetourt County militia and served as guide and chief scout for General Andrew Lewis's late summer march to Point Pleasant. This led directly to the defeat of Chief Cornstalk's native forces at the Battle of Point Pleasant in October. Soon after the battle, Arbuckle had returned to Greenbrier County and established his residence near Fort Savannah, later known as Lewisburg. In 1776, Arbuckle built Fort Randolph at Point Pleasant and was in command there the following year when a contingent of newly arrived and undisciplined militia witnessed one of their number killed and scalped by Indians. This mob overcame their officers' (including Arbuckle's) attempts to maintain order and famously murdered the captive Cornstalk, an event which cast a shadow over the region for decades.

In 1778, Arbuckle was active in raising the siege of Fort Donnally, near his home in Greenbrier County. When the town of Lewisburg was formally laid out in 1780, Arbuckle was the first settler. After discharge from active military service he farmed his extensive lands and served in several official public positions. In March 1781, he was commissioned to lay out a route from Lewisburg to Warm Springs, Bath County, Virginia. On June 27, returning from the temporary state capital at Staunton with Archer Mathews, the men became trapped in a violent storm near the banks of the Jackson River and Arbuckle was killed by a falling tree. He was laid to rest where he fell and was survived by his widow (Frances Lawrence Arbuckle Hunter Welch; 1749 – 1834) and six sons (Charles, 1768–1846; John, 1771–1843; James Harvey, 1774–1869; Mathew Jr, 1778–1851; Thomas, 1780–1838; and Samuel, 1782–1831).
