= Homer A. Holt (justice) =

American judge (1831–1898)

Homer Aloncious Holt

Justice of the Supreme Court of West Virginia
- In office Nov. 8, 1890 – Dec. 31, 1896
- Preceded by: Adam Clarke Snyder
- Succeeded by: Henry C. McWhorter

Personal details
- Born: April 27, 1831 Parkersburg, Virginia, U.S.
- Died: January 7, 1898 (aged 66) Lewisburg, West Virginia
- Party: Democratic
- Education: West Virginia University
- Profession: Politician, lawyer, judge

Homer Aloncious Holt (born April 27, 1831, Parkersburg, then in Virginia; died January 7, 1898, Lewisburg, West Virginia) was a West Virginia lawyer and justice of the West Virginia Supreme Court of Appeals.

Holt practiced as a lawyer from 1853 to 1873, except for a period of service as a Confederate soldier during the Civil War. He was a delegate to the West Virginia Constitutional Convention of 1872. In that year he was also elected to the position of local circuit court judge. After the circuit boundaries were reformed, he was again elected to a circuit judge position. In 1890 he was appointed to the state Supreme Court of Appeals to fill a vacancy, and then was elected to the remaining 4 years of that term in 1892.

In 1871 he and Alexander F. Mathews founded the Bank of Lewisburg. It was the first bank in Greenbrier County, opening for business on July 29. From 1871 to 1888, it was the only bank between Staunton, Virginia and Charleston, West Virginia.

He married Mary Ann Byrne in 1857, and they had 3 children. One of his grandchildren, born just after his death and named in his honor was Homer A. Holt, a lawyer, attorney general, and governor of West Virginia.
