= Homeplace (Frankford, West Virginia) =

Historic house in West Virginia, United States

- U.S. National Register of Historic Places
- Location within West Virginia Location within the United States
- Location: U.S. Route 219 North, near Frankford, West Virginia
- Coordinates: 37°54′43″N 80°22′55″W
- Area: less than one acre
- Built: c. 1850
- Architectural style: Federal
- NRHP reference No.: 07001415
- Added to NRHP: January 17, 2008

Homeplace, also known as Homestead Farm, is a historic home located near Frankford, Greenbrier County, West Virginia. It was built about 1850, and is a two-story, brick Federal style dwelling with a hipped roof. It has a symmetrical facade and sits on a stone foundation.

It was listed on the National Register of Historic Places in 2007.
