= James French Patton =

American lawyer (1843–1882)

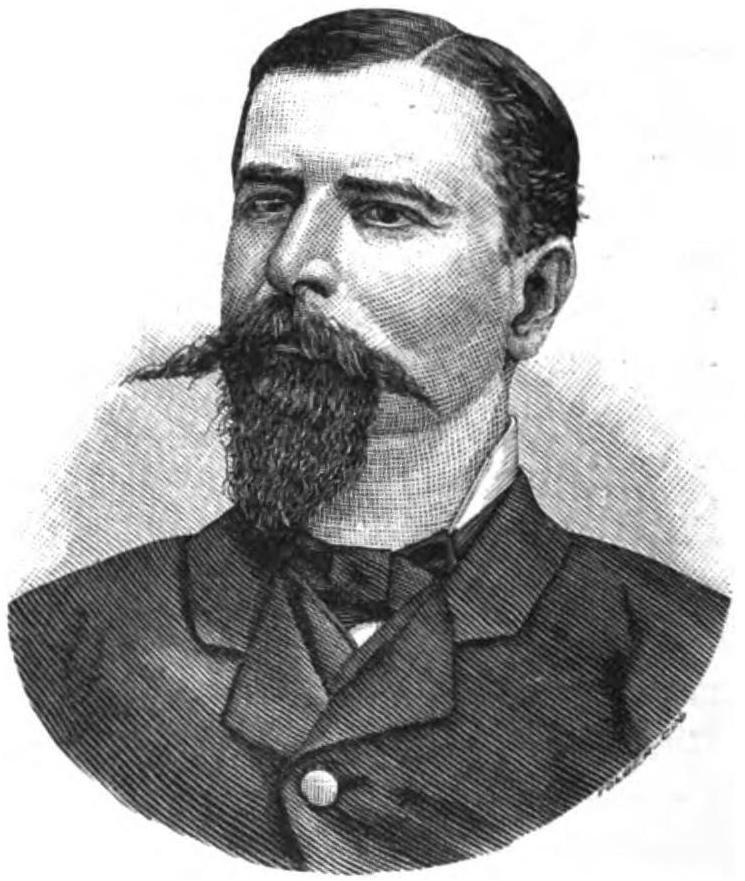
- Patton in a 1890 publication

Judge West Virginia Court of Appeals
- In office June 1, 1881 – March 30, 1882
- Preceded by: Charles Page Thomas Moore
- Succeeded by: Adam Clarke Snyder

Personal details
- Born: September 19, 1843 Richmond, Virginia, U.S.
- Died: March 30, 1882 (aged 38) Wheeling, West Virginia, U.S.
- Resting place: Union, West Virginia, U.S.
- Party: Democratic
- Spouse: Malinda Caperton (m. 1869)
- Children: 2
- Parent: John M. Patton (father)
- Relatives: Isaac W. Patton (brother); George S. Patton Sr. (brother); George S. Patton (grand nephew)
- Education: Andover Academy
- Profession: Confederate officer, lawyer, judge

James French Patton (September 19, 1843 – March 30, 1882) was an American lawyer, Confederate army officer, and Democratic politician who briefly served on the Supreme Court of Appeals of West Virginia.

== Early life ==
James French Patton was born on September 19, 1843, in Richmond, Virginia, to Peggy French (née Williams) and Congressman John M. Patton. His great-grandfather was Gen. Hugh Mercer, who fought at the Battle of Princeton in 1776. At age 14, Patton was enrolled in Andover Academy. After his father died in 1858, the family moved to Culpeper County, Virginia. At the age of 18, he joined the Confederate States Army as a private in the 22nd Virginia Infantry Regiment, led by his brother George S. Patton Sr. He attained the rank of lieutenant. He was wounded in battle. After the war, he returned to Virginia and studied law under his brother-in-law John Gilmer of Pittyslvania County. He was admitted to the bar.

== Career ==
Patton then began practicing law. In 1870, he joined a law partnership with Allen T. Caperton and relocated to Union in Monroe County, West Virginia, after his marriage. In 1872, Patton was elected as a Democrat as prosecuting attorney of Monroe County and served four years. On June 1, 1881, Governor Jacob B. Jackson appointed Patton to a vacated seat on the Supreme Court of Appeals of West Virginia caused by the retirement of Justice Charles Page Thomas Moore.

== Personal life ==
In April 1869, Patton married Malinda Caperton, the daughter of U.S. Senator Allen T. Caperton. They had two children, Harriet Echols Patton Edwards (1870-1929) and Allen Gilmer Patton (1871-1910). A. Gilmer Patton was also a lawyer and was elected to the West Virginia legislature shortly before his death. After he died, his wife married judge Edward Franklin Bingham.

Patton died suddenly of a heart condition on March 30, 1882, in Wheeling, West Virginia, at the age of 38. He was buried in Union. His brother Isaac W. Patton was a soldier, plantation owner, and the mayor of New Orleans, Louisiana. World War II General George S. Patton was the grandchild of James French Patton's brother George S. Patton Sr.

== See also ==
- List of justices of the Supreme Court of Appeals of West Virginia

== Sources ==
- Atkinson, Wesley George; Gibbens, Alvaro Franklin (1890). Prominent Men of West Virginia. Wheeling: W.L. Callin. pp. 288–291. OCLC 3886825.

Legal offices
Preceded by Charles P.T. Moore	Supreme Court of Appeals of West Virginia; 1881–1882	Succeeded by Adam Clarke Snydor
