= Fort Randolph (West Virginia) =

Former fort in Point Pleasant, West Virginia

- Point Pleasant, West Virginia
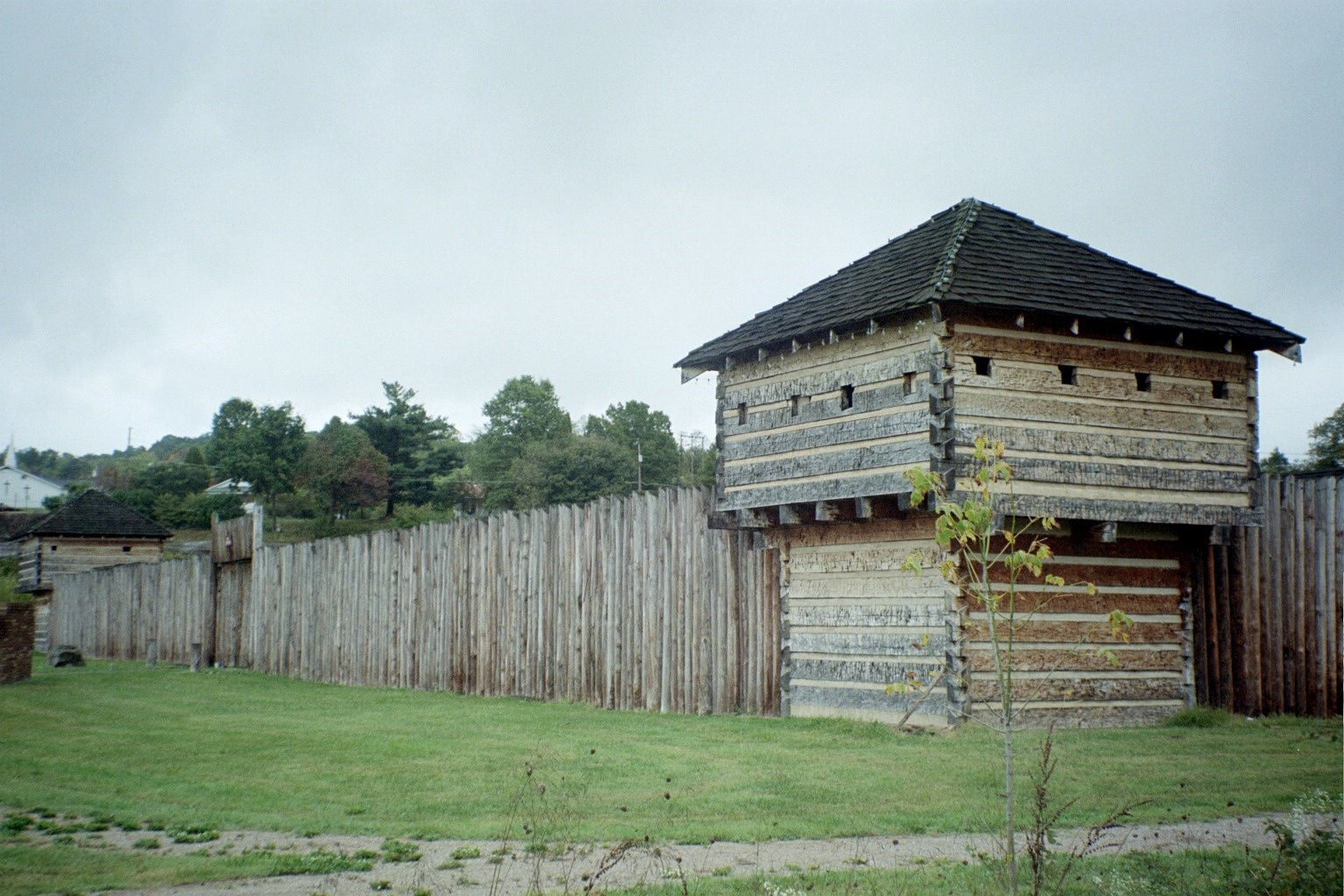
- Modern replica of Fort Randolph

Site information
- Type: stockade

Location
- Coordinates: 38.83765°N 82.12202°W

Site history
- Built: original construction in 1776, rebuilt in 1785, modern reconstruction in 1974
- In use: 1776–1779; 1785–1790s
- Battles/wars: Western theater of the American Revolutionary War

Garrison information
- Past commanders: Matthew Arbuckle, Sr. William McKee
- Garrison: 100 men at full strength

Fort Randolph was an American Revolutionary War fort which stood at the confluence of the Ohio and Kanawha Rivers, on the site of present-day Point Pleasant, West Virginia, United States.

Built in 1776 on the site of an earlier fort from Dunmore's War, Fort Randolph is best remembered as the place where the famous Shawnee Chief Cornstalk was murdered in 1777. The fort withstood attack by Native Americans in 1778 but was abandoned the next year. It was rebuilt in the 1780s after the renewal of hostilities between the United States and Native Americans, but saw little action and was eventually abandoned once again. Two centuries later, a replica of the fort has been built about a mile away.

== History ==
=== Background ===
The site where Fort Randolph was built emerged as a strategic location in the years before the American Revolution. In the Treaty of Fort Stanwix of 1768, the British Crown acquired the title to present-day West Virginia from the Iroquois. Thereafter, American colonists and land speculators began to explore the region. One of the first to do so was George Washington, a planter and politician from Virginia, who in 1770 made a long canoe trip down the Ohio River to examine the land around Point Pleasant. Many other American colonists and surveyors did the same over the next few years.

The American Indians of the Ohio Country, who hunted on the land south of the Ohio River, had not been consulted in the 1768 treaty. The eventual result was Dunmore's War in 1774, fought primarily between American militiament from Virginia and Shawnees and Mingos from the Ohio Country, led by Chief Cornstalk. The Battle of Point Pleasant, the only major battle of the war, was fought on the future site of Fort Randolph. After the battle, a small fort called Fort Blair was built near the battlefield. With the outbreak of the American Revolutionary War in 1775, however, Lord Dunmore, the Royal Governor of Virginia, ordered the abandonment of the fort, one of his last actions before being forced from office by the American revolutionaries.

=== Revolutionary War ===
In 1776, the Virginia Assembly, alarmed at the defenseless state of their western border, ordered a new fort built on the site. Virginia militiamen under Captain Matthew Arbuckle, Sr., built Fort Randolph in May 1776. It was named after Peyton Randolph, the first president of the Continental Congress, who had died the previous year. The fort, along with Fort Pitt and Fort Henry, was intended to prevent Indian raids into western Virginia and Pennsylvania.

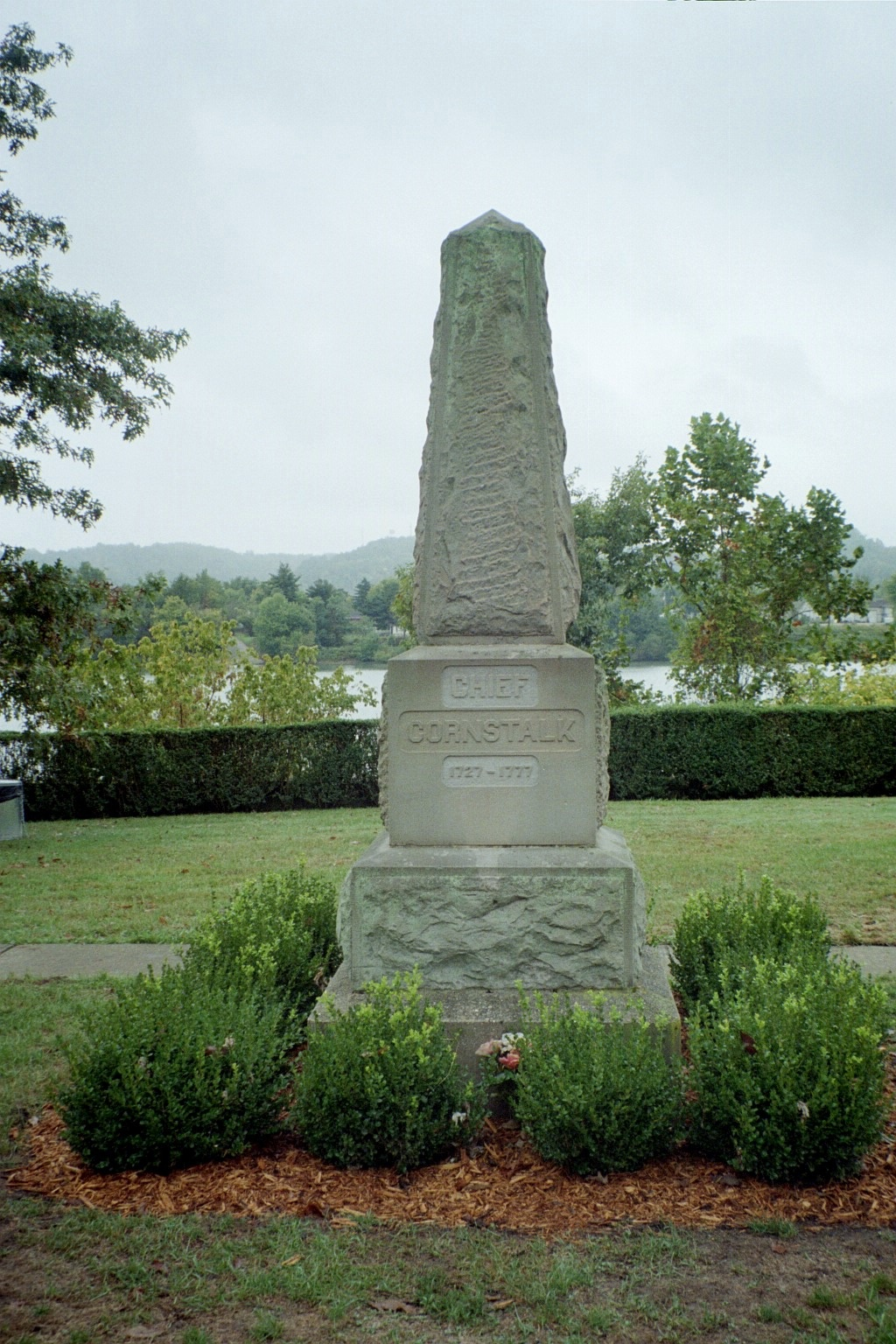
Gravesite of Cornstalk at Tu-Endie-Wei State Park in Point Pleasant, near where Fort Randolph stood

The forts failed to deter raids. In November 1776, Andrew Donnally and Archer Mathews, commissaries for the fort, described the difficulties of supplying the fort with food and provisions due to the constant threat of Indian attack. In 1777, the Americans made preparations for an offensive expedition into the Ohio Country. In November, Cornstalk made a diplomatic visit to Fort Randolph in order to discuss the rumored expedition. Shawnees who followed Cornstalk wanted to stay out of the war, but Cornstalk warned the Americans that he would not be able to keep all of the tribe neutral. Although the proposed campaign had been cancelled because of a manpower shortage, Captain Arbuckle decided to detain Cornstalk and several other Shawnees as hostages in order to ensure that the Shawnees stayed neutral. When an American militiaman was killed outside the fort by Indians on November 10, his enraged companions charged into the fort and murdered Cornstalk and the other three Shawnee prisoners. Virginia's governor Patrick Henry brought the killers to trial, but they were acquitted because no one would testify against them.

On May 20, 1778, about 200 Shawnee under Chief Blackfish, Wyandots and Mingos under Dunquat, the Wyandot "Half King", surrounded Fort Randolph and began a week-long siege. Unable to compel the surrender of the fort, the Indians then moved up the Kanawha to attack Fort Donnally, which also withstood attack. Apparently because resources were needed elsewhere, Fort Randolph was abandoned by the Americans in 1779. Indians burned the fort after it was abandoned.

=== Twice rebuilt ===
The fort was rebuilt nearby in 1785 during the growth of violence, which led to the Northwest Indian War.

A replica of the fort was built in 1973–74 and dedicated on October 10, 1974, the 200th anniversary of the Battle of Point Pleasant. The town of Point Pleasant had spread over where the fort had stood, and so the rebuilt fort was located at Krodel Park, about one mile from the original location.
