= Alice Mary Dowd =

American educator and author

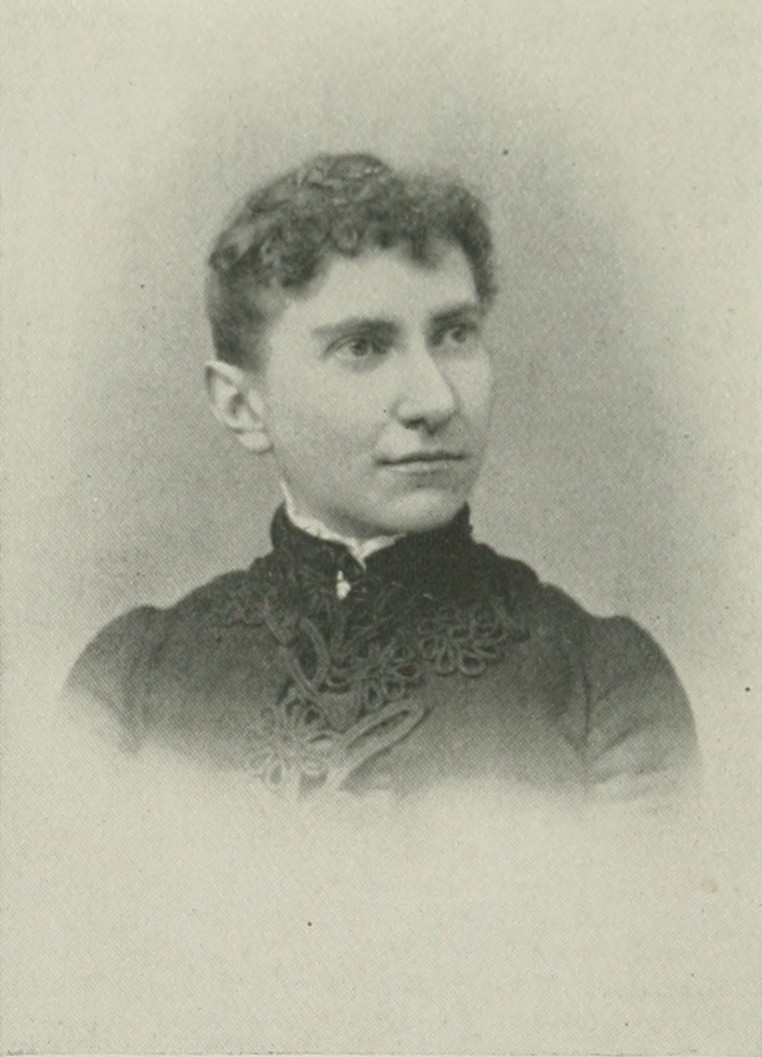
- "A Woman of the Century"
- Born: December 16, 1855; Frankford, Virginia, U.S.
- Died: July 2, 1943 (aged 87); Hudson, New York, U.S.
- Resting place: Pine Hill Cemetery, Westfield, Massachusetts, U.S.
- Education: Westfield High School, Westfield State University
- Occupations: educator, author
- Relatives: Luella Dowd Smith (sister)
- Writing career
- Pen name: Alice M. Dowd
- Language: English
- Genres: poetry, textbook
- Notable work: Vacation Verses

Alice Mary Dowd (pen name, Alice M. Dowd; December 16, 1855 – July 2, 1943) was an American educator and author. She was born in Virginia in 1855 and began teaching at the age of seventeen. Dowd taught for more than three decades before retiring in 1926, having had experience in almost all phases of the work, including district school substitute, evening school, private school, high school, college, and Sunday school. Besides numerous uncollected poems, she published a volume entitled Vacation Verses in 1890. In 1906, she published Our Common Wild Flowers. With her sister, Luella Dowd Smith, she co-authored another book of poetry, Along the Way, in 1938. Dowd was an occasional contributor to papers, and at one time, a regular contributor to the magazine edition of Pasadena News. Dowd died in 1943.

== Early years and education ==
Alice Mary (sometimes, Mary Alice) Dowd was born in Frankford, Virginia, on December 16, 1855 to Emily (née Curtiss) and Almeron (sometimes spelled Almeson) Dowd. Her parents were school-teachers of Puritan descent, their ancestors having landed in New England about the year 1630. In both families were found officers and privates of the Revolutionary army. On her father's side, she was related to the family of Field and the old English family of Dudley. She was the youngest of four children, though only she and her sister Luella survived childhood. Her other siblings were Curtis Field and Emily Virginia. Dowd's early home was among the Berkshires, whence her parents removed to Westfield, Massachusetts, a town noted for its schools. Dowd was a delicate child, and her parents hoped she would reach adulthood. Shy and reserved, at a young age, she showed a great love of nature and a deep appreciation of all natural beauty.

Dowd was educated at home and in the public schools of Westfield. She was graduated first rank from the English and classical departments of the high school, taking the two courses simultaneously. In the State Normal School (now Westfield State University, she studied optionals with the prescribed branches, composed a class hymn sung at her graduation, and was the class poet. She took several courses in the Sauveur Summer School of Languages, which included foreign study and travel, and especially fitted herself to give instruction in German.

== Career ==
After graduation, she was constantly employed as a teacher. For more than a decade she held the position of first assistant in the high school of Stamford, Connecticut. Of scholarly attainments, she helped many young men to prepare for college. She published a volume of verse, Vacation Verses (Buffalo, New York, 1891). In 1904, she left Stamford to take a post as a German teacher at Pomona College in Los Angeles County. Two years later, she published a text book, Our Common Wild Flowers, which received mixed reviews from critics.

Dowd returned east and between 1912 and 1914 taught at Philmont High School in Philmont, New York. She joined the Women's Political Union of New York writing articles in support of women's suffrage. In 1915, she was hired as the assistant principal of Madalin High School in Madalin. She taught German at the high school in Trumansburg from 1918 through 1921, when she went to teach mathematics and history at the high school in Fort Plain. Dowd was hired in 1923 to teach history and mathematics at the Burnt Hills-Ballston Lake High School, where she remained until her retirement in June 1926. For many years, she also taught in Sunday schools.

Dowd and her sister Luella, at that time known as Mrs. James W. Smith, left their homes in Hudson, New York upon her retirement and made a tour of western states with plans to permanently settle in California; however, they returned to Hudson and for several years lived there and wintered in Fort Myers, Florida. The sisters co-authored a book of verses, Along the Way in 1938.

== Personal life ==
Dowd was a member of the Daughters of the American Revolution and an associate member of the Woman's Christian Temperance Union. She enjoyed bicycle riding and photography.

In religion, Dowd was a Universalist. She survived her sister, Luella, who died July 7, 1941. In early 1943, while living in Hudson, New York, she received a gift of Florida oranges from her friends, Mr. and Mrs. Charles Rivenburg. Dowd died at her home in Hudson, on July 2, 1943, at the age of eighty-seven, and is buried at Pine Hill Cemetery, in Westfield.

== Selected works ==
- Vacation Verses, 1890
- Our Common Wild Flowers, 1906
- Along the Way, 1938
