= Luella Dowd Smith =

American educator and author

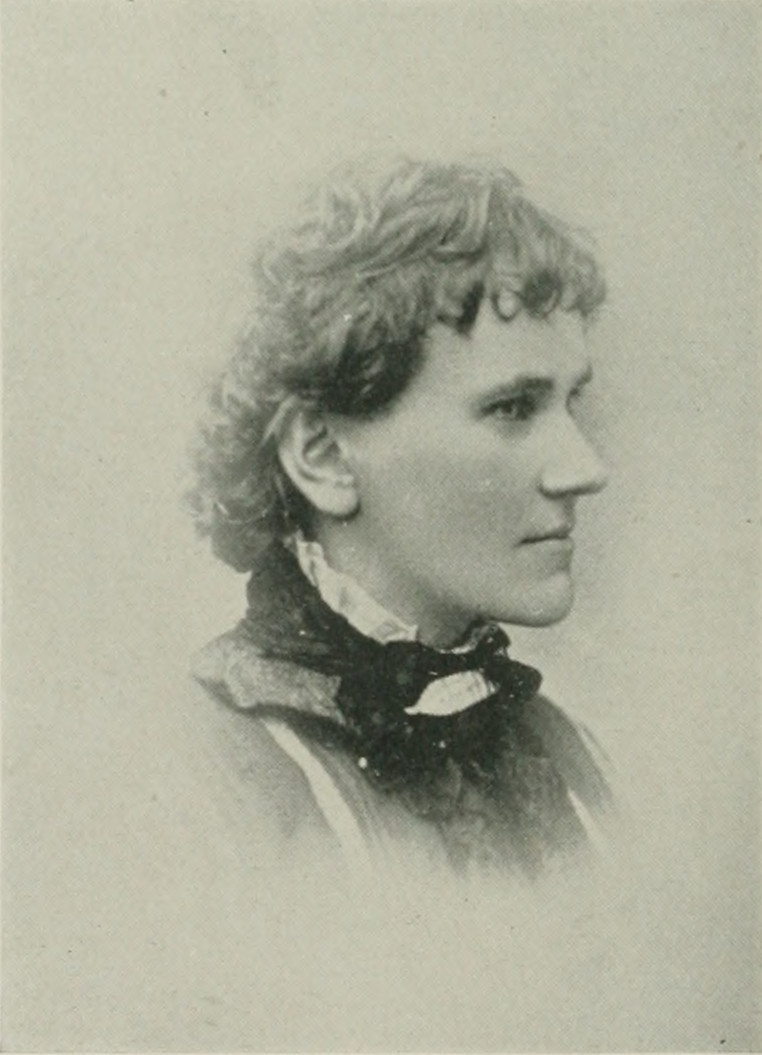
- Photo in A Woman of the Century
- Born: Jane Luella Dowd; June 16, 1847; Sheffield, Massachusetts, U.S.
- Died: July 4, 1941 (aged 94); Hudson, New York, U.S.
- Education: South Egremont Academy, Charles F. Dowd's Seminary
- Occupations: educator, author, reformer
- Spouse: Henry Hadley Smith (m. 1875)
- Relatives: Alice Mary Dowd (sister)
- Writing career
- Language: English
- Genres: prose, verse
- Literary movement: temperance

Luella Dowd Smith (née, Dowd; June 16, 1847 – July 4, 1941) was an American educator and author of prose and verse. She was active in social reform movements of the day. Smith taught school for ten years and was the principal of three high schools and one academy. She was also active in the areas of temperance, Sunday school, prohibition, and equal suffrage. Smith wrote for the National Temperance Society. She was the author of Wayside Leaves, 1879; Wind Flowers, 1887; Flowers from Foreign Fields, 1895; The Value of the Church, 1898; Thirteen Temperance Theses and Two Trilogies, 1901; as well as Ways to win, 1904; Daily ideas and ideals, 1930; and Along the way; poems, 1938.

== Early life and education ==
Jane Luella Dowd was born in Sheffield, Massachusetts, June 16, 1847. The eldest of the four children, her parents were Almeron and Emily (Curtiss) Dowd. At the age of two, the family removed to West Virginia, where they remained nine years. Her parents were teachers, and she was educated by them at home and in the schools which they conducted.

On their return to Massachusetts, when Smith was eleven years old, her education was continued in the South Egremont Academy, where she afterward taught, in the High and Normal Schools of Westfield (1866), and in Charles F. Dowd's Seminary, later known as Temple Grove Seminary, of Saratoga Springs, New York. From this last institution she graduated in 1868 with the highest honor.

== Career ==
Smith taught school for several years, beside giving private lessons. She also carried on Sunday school, temperance, and equal suffrage work.

On May 18, 1875, she married Henry Hadley Smith, M. D. They lived in Sheffield until 1884, when they went to Europe. After returning to the United States, they settled in Hudson, New York, where Dr. Smith practiced medicine.

Smith's literary work dates from her youth. She wrote much, in both prose and verse, and she contributed to many magazines and periodicals. In 1879, she collected some of her productions and published them in a volume entitled Wayside Leaves (New York City). In 1887, she brought out a second volume, Wind Flowers (Chicago). Her subsequent productions included Flowers from Foreign Fields, 1895; The Value of the Church, 1898; and Thirteen Temperance Theses and Two Trilogies, 1901. In 1938, with her sister, Alice Mary Dowd, she co-authored a book of verses, Along the Way.

== Death ==
Jane Luella Dowd Smith died in Hudson, New York, July 4, 1941.

== Selected works ==
- Wayside Leaves, 1879
- Wind Flowers, 1887
- Flowers from Foreign Fields, 1895
- The Value of the Church, 1898
- Thirteen Temperance Theses and Two Trilogies, 1901
- Ways to win, 1904
- Daily ideas and ideals, 1930
- Along the way; poems, 1938
