= USS General M. M. Patrick =

Transport ship built in 1944

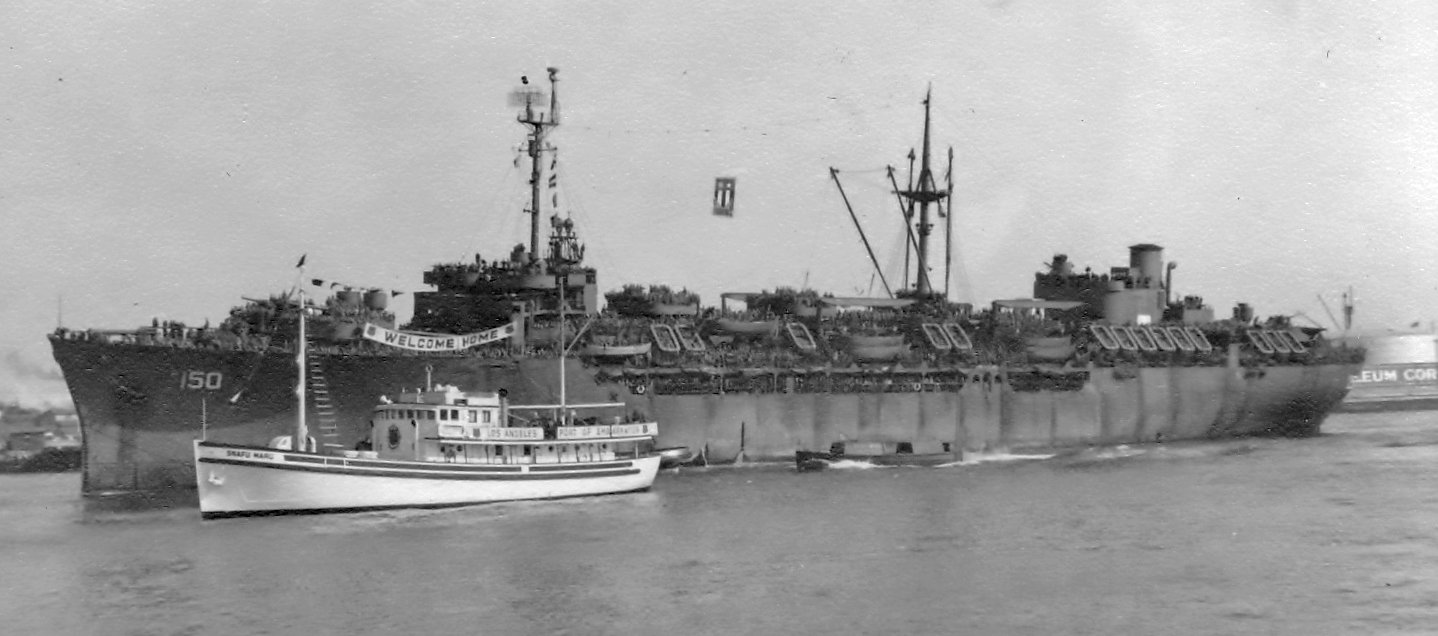
- USS General M. M. Patrick (T-AP-150), probably arriving in the Port of Los Angeles, California, at the conclusion of a "Magic Carpet" voyage from the Philippines, 28 January 1946.

History

United States
- Name: General M. M. Patrick
- Namesake: Mason Mathews Patrick
- Ordered: as a Type C4-S-A1 hull, MC hull 702
- Awarded: 3 March 1942
- Builder: Permanente Metals Corporation, Yard No. 3, Richmond, California
- Cost: $9,967,243.62
- Yard number: 16
- Way number: 2
- Laid down: 24 January 1944
- Launched: 21 June 1944
- Sponsored by: Mrs. William E. Lyne
- Commissioned: 4 September 1944
- Decommissioned: 8 March 1946
- Stricken: 20 March 1946
- Identification: IMO number: 6903137; Hull symbol: AP-150; Call sign: NJIK
- Fate: Transferred to the Maritime Commission (MARCOM), 30 August 1946
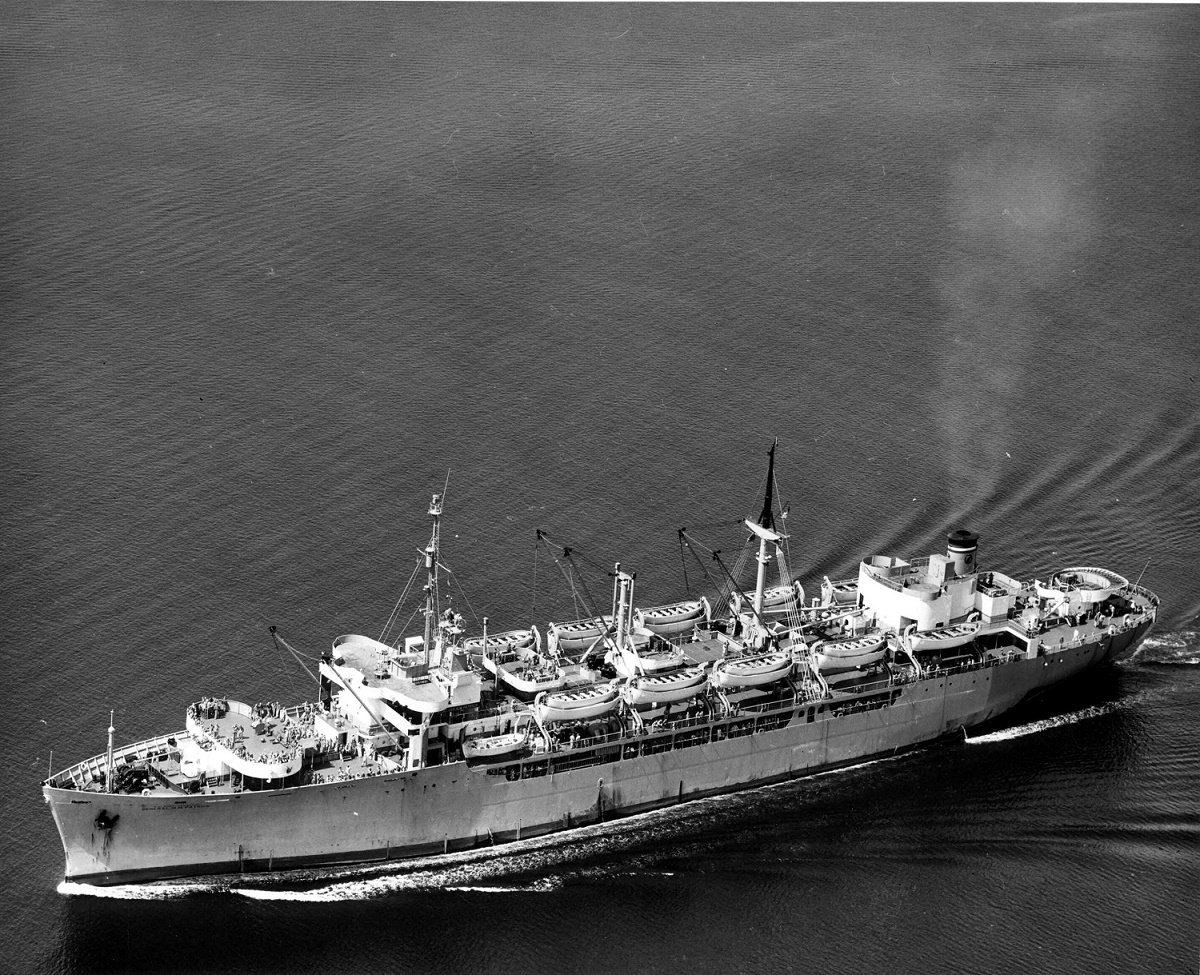
- USAT General M. M. Patrick, underway off Tacoma, Washington, in August 1948. The gun tubs are still in place but the armaments have been removed. Additional lifeboats added with war-time life rafts removed.

United States
- Name: General M. M. Patrick
- Operator: US Army
- In service: 1946
- Out of service: 1950
- Fate: Transferred to the US Navy, 1 March 1950
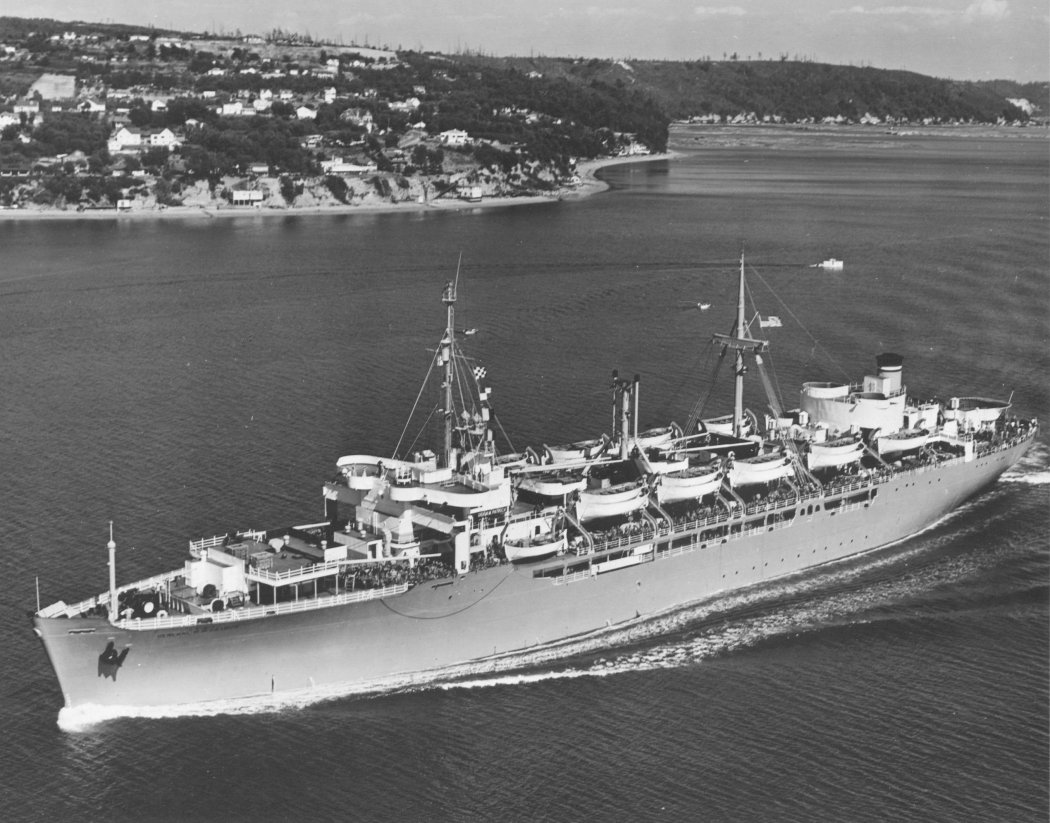
- USNS General M. M. Patrick (T-AP-150), seen here departing Tacoma, Washington, bound for Yokosuka, Japan, November 1952. The ex-bow gun emplacement has been enlarged.

United States
- Name: General M. M. Patrick
- Operator: Military Sea Transport Service (MSTS)
- In service: 1 March 1950
- Out of service: 16 October 1958
- Stricken: 20 March 1946
- Identification: Hull symbol: T-AP-150
- Honors and awards: 2 × Battle Stars
- Fate: Laid up in the National Defense Reserve Fleet, Olympia, Washington, 16 October 1958

United States
- Name: Boston
- Owner: Container Ship Chartering Service, Inc.
- Operator: Sea-Land Service, Inc.
- Renamed: June 1968
- Refit: converted to container ship, 1968
- Fate: Sold to Litton Industries Leasing Corp., 17 September 1968

United States
- Name: Boston
- Owner: Litton Industries Leasing Corp.
- Fate: Sold to Reynolds Leasing Corp., 28 February 1975

United States
- Name: Boston
- Owner: Reynolds Leasing Corp.
- Fate: Sold to Sea-Land Service, Inc., 12 February 1987

United States
- Name: Boston
- Owner: Sea-Land Service, Inc.
- Fate: Sold for scrapping, May 1988

General characteristics
- Class & type: General G. O. Squier-class transport ship
- Displacement: 9,950 LT (10,110 t) (light); 17,250 LT (17,530 t) (full)
- Length: 522 ft 10 in (159.36 m)
- Beam: 71 ft 6 in (21.79 m)
- Draft: 26 ft 6 in (8.08 m)
- Installed power: 2 × Babcock & Wilcox header type boilers, 465 psi (3,210 kPa), 765 °F (407 °C); 9,000 shp (6,700 kW)
- Propulsion: 1 × steam turbine; 1 × screw
- Speed: 16.5 kn (30.6 km/h; 19.0 mph)
- Capacity: 3,343 troops
- Complement: 425 (officers and enlisted)
- Armament: 4 × 5 in (130 mm)/38 caliber guns; 8 × 1.1 in (28 mm)/75 caliber AA guns; 16 × 20 mm (0.79 in) Oerlikon AA guns

USS General M. M. Patrick (AP-150) was a General G. O. Squier-class transport ship built for the US Navy in World War II. She was named in honor of US Army general Mason Mathews Patrick, a graduate of the US Military Academy in 1886. Promoted to major general in 1918, during World War I, he was appointed Chief of the Army Air Service, the position he held until his retirement in 1927. After the Armistice, he represented the A.E.F. at the Paris Peace Conference.

She was transferred to the US Army as USAT General M. M. Patrick in 1946. On 1 March 1950, she was transferred to the Military Sea Transportation Service (MSTS) as USNS General M. M. Patrick (T-AP-150). She was later sold for commercial operation and rebuilt as a container ship.

== Construction ==
General M. M. Patrick was laid down on 24 January 1944, under a Maritime Commission (MARCOM) contract, MC hull 707, by Kaiser Co., Inc., Yard 3, Richmond, California; sponsored by Mrs. William E. Lynd; she was launched on 21 June 1944. She was acquired by the US Navy on 4 September 1944; and commissioned at San Francisco.

== Service history ==
After shakedown, General M. M. Patrick departed San Francisco, 14 October, and transported nearly 3,000 troops to Pearl Harbor and Guam, before returning to San Francisco, 18 January 1945, with military passengers. Between 19 February and 6 March, she carried more troops from Seattle to Hawaii, and returned sailors to San Francisco. With a full load of troops embarked, she then sailed 16 March, for the Southwest Pacific, where she arrived San Pedro Bay, Philippines, 18 April. After shuttling troops from Allied bases along the northern coast of New Guinea to Luzon, she departed Manila, 16 May, and brought home returning veterans, arriving San Francisco, 12 June. Once again departing San Francisco, 28 June, she transported 3,000 troops and passengers to Fremantle, Australia; steamed to Calcutta, India, to embark passengers; then sailed via the Suez Canal to New York, where she arrived 3 September.

On 22 September 1945, General M. M. Patrick departed on another Magic Carpet voyage to Calcutta, and back to New York, arriving 16 November. Departing New York, 9 days later, she embarked still more troops at Calcutta, Karachi, and Tuticorin, India; steamed via Ceylon and Singapore, for the West Coast; and arrived San Pedro, 28 January 1946.

She decommissioned 8 March, and was returned to WSA 11 March, for use as an Army transport under the Army Transportation Service.

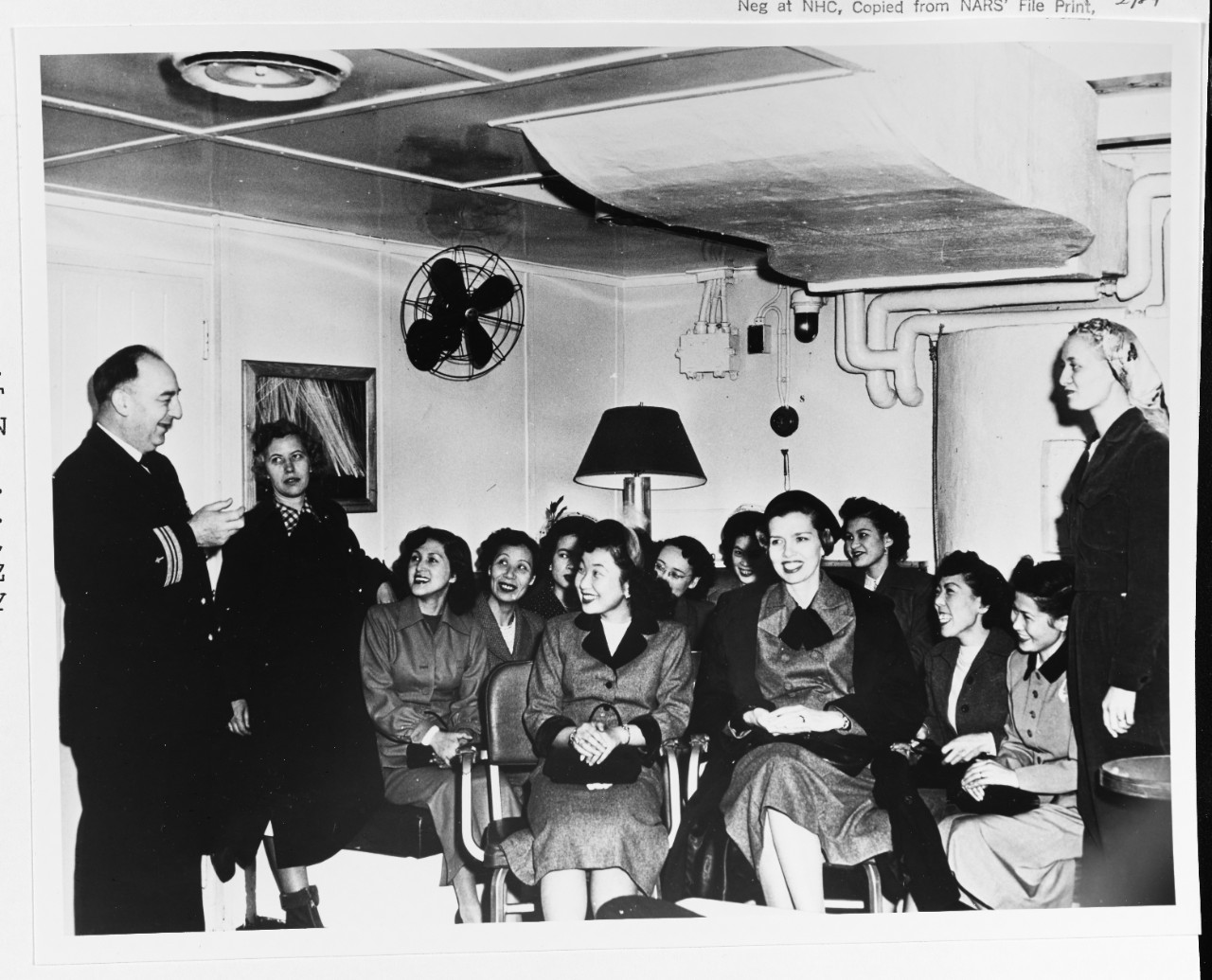
Lieutenant Commander E.W. Andrews (Chaplain Corps) illustrates a point during a course in U.S. customs for a group of Japanese war brides en route to the U.S., 19 December 1951. Assisting him are Mrs. Viola Johnson (left), Mrs. Robert W. Lantz (center) and Mrs. Betty Waser (right). Aboard USNS General M. M. Patrick (T-AP-150)

General M. M. Patrick was reacquired by the Navy 1 March 1950, and assigned to duty as an overseas transport under MSTS. Crewed by civilians, during the Korean War she operated between Seattle and the Far East, and carried tens of thousands of combat troops to Korea. After the armistice, she continued steaming from Seattle to Yokohama, Japan, and back, returning veterans of the Korean fighting to the United States and deploying troops to the Far East.

On 29 November 1952, USNS General M. M. Patrick steamed from Yokohama to Seattle, with some 118 paintings, sculptures, and examples of applied arts destined for the 1953 exhibition Japanese Painting and Sculpture. This exhibition was a pivotal exhibition of Japanese art in America, and was seen at the National Gallery of Art, the Metropolitan Museum of Art, the Museum of Fine Arts, Boston, the Art Institute of Chicago, and the Seattle Art Museum. Secretary of Defense Charles Erwin Wilson – a member of the Honorary Committee for the exhibition – arranged for the use of General M. M. Patrick for the exhibit, the only international art exhibition ever to receive such support by the Defense Department.

General M. M. Patrick was returned to the Maritime Administration 17 October 1958, and entered the National Defense Reserve Fleet (NDRF) at Olympia, Washington.

== Commercial service ==
The ship was sold for commercial use 6 November 1967, to Container Ship Chartering Service Inc., and in spring 1968, was converted by Todd Shipyard, Galveston, Texas, to a container ship and renamed Boston, in June 1968. On 17 September 1968, she was sold to Litton Industries Leasing Corp. On 28 February 1975, she was sold to Reynolds Leasing Corp. On 12 February 1987, while at sea, she was sold to Sea-Land Services, Inc. She was sold for scrapping in May 1988.

On 15 April 2010, she headed to San Francisco, for preparation to go through the Panama Canal to Texas, for scrapping. She left San Francisco Bay, in early May, destined for the Texas scrapyard.

== Awards ==
- Asiatic-Pacific Campaign Medal
- European-African-Middle Eastern Campaign Medal
- World War II Victory Medal
- National Defense Service Medal
- Korean Service Medal with two battle stars
- Korean War Service Medal (Korea)
- United Nations Korea Medal

== Bibliography ==
- "Kaiser Permanente No. 3, Richmond CA". ShipbuildingHistory.com. 27 November 2010.
- Maritime Administration. "General M. M. Patrick". Ship History Database Vessel Status Card. U.S. Department of Transportation, Maritime Administration.
- "General M. M. Patrick".
- "General M. M. Patrick (AP-150)". Dictionary of American Naval Fighting Ships. Naval History and Heritage Command. 10 July 2015.
- "USNS General M. M. Patrick (T-AP-150)". NavSource. 7 February 2020.
- Shimizu, Yoshiaki (1 March 2001). "Japan in American Museums – but which Japan?". The Art Bulletin. LXXXIII (1): 123–134. doi:10.2307/3177193. ISSN 0004-3079. JSTOR 3177193. OCLC 5784747. Archived from the original on 14 September 2007.
