= Alexander F. Mathews =

American lawyer and banker (1838–1906)

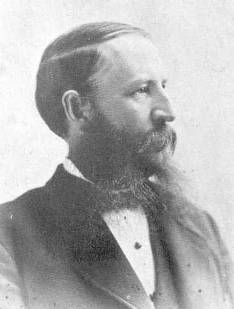

Personal details
- Born: November 13, 1838 Lewisburg, Virginia
- Died: December 17, 1906 (aged 68) Lewisburg, West Virginia
- Spouse: Laura Maud Gardner
- Relations: Mathews family
- Education: University of Virginia
- Profession: lawyer, banker, financier

Military service
- Allegiance: Confederate States of America
- Years of service: 1861-1865
- Rank: Captain; Assistant Commissary of Subsistence; Inspector of Conscription for the 8th Congressional District of Virginia
- Unit: 59th Virginia Infantry 1861-1863

Alexander Ferdinand Mathews (November 13, 1838 – December 17, 1906) was an American lawyer, banker, and university board director in the U.S. State of West Virginia. He served as a Confederate officer and aide-de-camp to Brigadier General Henry A. Wise during the American Civil War.

== Early life ==
Alexander F. Mathews born on November 13, 1838, in Frankford, Greenbrier County, Virginia, to Eliza (Reynolds) and Mason Mathews. He was educated at the local Lewisburg Academy and enrolled in the University of Virginia in 1854 at the age of 15, where he earned a Masters of Arts in less than two years, graduating before his 18th year. This accomplishment was said to have been unprecedented in the history of the university at the time. He was a member of the Beta Theta Pi fraternity. He returned to the University of Virginia School of Law in 1857, and in the same year was admitted to the bar.

== Civil War ==
On the outbreak of the American Civil War in 1861, Mathews volunteered for the Confederate States Army. He received a commission of captain and was assigned to the staff of Brigadier General Henry A. Wise as Wise's aide-de-camp during Wise's unsuccessful campaigns in Western Virginia. Wise's brigade was broken up, and Mathews was reassigned to the 59th Virginia Infantry as first lieutenant and drillmaster. In 1864, he was again reassigned to of Inspector of Conscription for Virginia's 8th congressional district, where he remained for the remainder of the war.

== Postbellum ==
Mathews married Laura M. Gardner on December 28, 1865. Together they had eight children: Mason, Charles Gardner, Mary Miller, Eliza Patton, Maud, Florence, and Henry.

Due to the restrictions placed on former Confederates in the years after the war, Mathews was unable to practice the law. He taught for several years at the Lewisburg Academy, where he had received his early education. When restrictions for Confederates were lifted, he and his brother Henry M. Mathews opened a law firm under the name Mathews & Mathews, which became one of the most successful in the region.

Mathews was appointed to the West Virginia University Board of Regents during that institution's infancy, and served on the board from 1871 to 1881.

In 1871, Mathews, along with Adam C. Snydor and Homer A. Holt, founded the first bank in Greenbrier County, West Virginia. Until 1888, this was the only bank between Staunton, Virginia and Charleston, West Virginia some 200 miles apart. He served as president or director of the bank continuously until his death. Mathews additionally took part in the founding the First National Bank of Ronceverte, when it was chartered by the State of West Virginia in 1888.

He died on December 16, 1906, in Philadelphia, Pennsylvania and was buried at the Old Stone Church in Lewisburg, West Virginia.

== Bibliography ==
- Combs, James Thurl (1987). Greenbrier, C.S.A. Wartime Letters of Mason Mathews to his son Captain Joseph William Mathews, C.S.A., p. 5–44. Parsons, West Virginia: The Journal of the Greenbrier Historical Society. OCLC 13983198.
- "The Credit of the County". Lewisburg Living History Exhibit. The City of Lewisburg.
