= Frankford, West Virginia =

Unincorporated community in West Virginia, United States

- Unincorporated community
- Location within West Virginia Location within the United States
- Coordinates: 37°55′30″N 80°23′04″W
- Country: United States
- State: West Virginia
- County: Greenbrier
- Elevation: 2,198 ft (670 m)
- Time zone: UTC-5 (Eastern (EST))
  - Summer (DST): UTC-4 (EDT)
- ZIP code: 24938
- Area codes: 304 & 681
- GNIS feature ID: 1554502

Frankford is an unincorporated community in Greenbrier County, West Virginia, United States. Frankford is located on U.S. Route 219, south of Falling Spring and north of Maxwelton. Frankford has a post office with ZIP code 24938.

Frankford is the home of Frankford Elementary School and the Frankford Volunteer Fire Department.

== History ==
The community derives its name from Frank Ludington, the original owner of the town site. Located near Frankford is Homeplace, listed on the National Register of Historic Places in 2007. Frankford was formerly an incorporated municipality.

== Notable people ==
- Alice Mary Dowd (1855–1943), educator, author
- Alexander F. Mathews, West Virginia banker.
- Henry M. Mathews, fifth governor of West Virginia.
