= Mathews family =

American political family

Mathews
- Current region: United States
- Origin: Britain
- Founded: Arrival in the Colony of Virginia c. 1730, Augusta County 289 years ago
- Founder: John Mathews (d. 1757); Ann Archer
- Members: George Mathews; Sampson Mathews; Henry M. Mathews; and others
- Connected families: Patrick

The Mathews family is an American political family descended from John Mathews (d. 1757) and Ann Archer, originating in colonial Virginia and active in Virginia and the American South in the 18th–20th centuries.

The family founders arrived in America from Britain around 1730, settling in Augusta County (present-day Rockbridge County), Virginia. Several members played a role in the American Revolution, and numerous members were elected to the Virginia General Assembly over successive generations, while additionally members were involved in the politics of Georgia, West Virginia, and other U.S. states in roles including state governor and state legislator. Members have served in the U.S. military as generals, colonels, and other officers. Notable members include George Mathews, Sampson Mathews, and Henry M. Mathews.

== British origin ==
John Mathews likely immigrated to America from County Armagh, Northern Ireland around 1730, with the family of his wife, Ann (Archer) Mathews, which was from neighboring County Tyrone. Beyond this, evidence of Mathews' activity in Europe before his immigration is scarce. Uncorroborated and conflicting family traditions report that the Mathews family was originally from Wales or England.

== Overview ==
John Mathews settled in Augusta County, Virginia around 1737, where he obtained significant land holdings and held several county offices.

A number of John's sons took part in patriot efforts during the American Revolution, with three serving as wartime Virginia legislators: Sampson Mathews (c. 1737–1807) and George Mathews (1739–1812) from Augusta County and Archer Mathews (1744–c. 1790) from Greenbrier County. Additionally, Sampson Mathews was a wartime lieutenant colonel of Virginia militia, while George Mathews was a brevet brigadier general in the Continental Army. After the war George Mathews moved to Georgia where he participated in the ratification of the Constitution of the United States and served as a governor of Georgia and a U.S. House representative to the 1st United States Congress. In his later life George Mathews, acting as a special agent for President James Madison, instigated the controversial Patriot War in Spanish East Florida, which ultimately resulted in the cession of Florida to the United States.

George Mathews' son George Mathews Jr. (1774–1836) served as judge of the Superior Courts of the territories of Mississippi and Orleans and later as presiding judge of the Louisiana Supreme Court. In Virginia, three more members of the family from the third generation served in the state legislature: Sampson Mathews Jr. from Bath County, and John Mathews (1768–1849) and James W. Mathews (d. 1825), grandsons of John Mathews through his son William Mathews (1741–1772), from Greenbrier County.

From the fourth generation, Mason Mathews (1803–1878), a grandson of William Mathews, served in the Virginia legislature from Greenbrier County leading up to and throughout the American Civil War, while three of his sons served as Confederate States Army officers. Greenbrier County, the seat of this branch of the family, was taken into the State of West Virginia on its creation in 1863. Mason's son Henry M. Mathews (1834–1884) served as an attorney general and governor of West Virginia. When the Great Railroad Strike of 1877 broke out in Martinsburg, West Virginia, Henry M. Mathews called out state militia units to contain the crisis and, when they failed, requested federal troops in an episode that helped set in motion the transformation of state militia systems into the National Guard.

Other relations include Mason M. Patrick (1863–1942), grandson of Mason Mathews, who was a chief of the U.S. Army Air Service during World War I and the Interwar period, drafted what would become the 1926 congressional bill that created the U.S. Army Air Corps, served as the first Air Corps chief, and as such played a foundational role in bringing the US Air Force into existence.

== Offices held ==
A list of offices held by patrilineal members of the Mathews family:

- John Mathews (d.1757), Justice of the Peace for Augusta County, Virginia, 1751–1757; Augusta Parish vestryman, 1746–1757; Virginia Colonial Militia captain. Father of Sampson, George, William, and Archer Mathews.
  - Sampson Mathews (c. 1737–1807), Virginia state senator from Augusta County and surrounding counties, 1776–1781, 1791–1792; member of the Virginia Governor's Council, 1781–1783; Virginia State Militia lieutenant colonel; Virginia Colonial Militia captain. Son of John Mathews.
    - Sampson Mathews Jr., Virginia House delegate from Bath County, 1809–1810. Son of Sampson Mathews
  - George Mathews (1739–1812), 20th governor of Georgia, 1787–1788 & 1793–1796; U.S. House representative from Georgia's 3rd congressional district, 1789–1791; Georgia assemblyman from Wilkes County, 1786; Virginia burgess from Augusta County, 1775; Continental Army brigadier general. Son of John Mathews.
    - George Mathews Jr. (1774–1836), presiding judge of the Louisiana Supreme Court, 1813–1836; judge of the Superior courts of the Territory of Orleans, 1806–1813; judge of the Superior Courts of the Territory of Mississippi 1805–1806. Son of George Mathews.
  - William Mathews (1741–1772), Justice of the Peace for Botetourt County, Virginia, 1770–1772. Son of John Mathews.
    - John Mathews (1768–1849), Virginia House delegate from Greenbrier County, 1798–1801, 1803–1804, 1813–1814, 1816, 1829. Son of William Mathews.
    - James W. Mathews (d. 1825), Virginia House delegate from Greenbrier County, 1802–1803; United States Army major. Son of William Mathews.
    - Joseph Mathews (1770–1834), Justice of the Peace for Greenbrier County, Virginia, 1804–1806. Son of William Mathews.
      - Mason Mathews (1803–1878), Virginia House delegate from Greenbrier County, 1859–1865. Son of Joseph Mathews.
        - Henry M. Mathews (1834–1884), 5th governor of West Virginia, 1877–1881; 7th attorney general of West Virginia, 1873–1877; West Virginia state senator 1865; Confederate States Army major. Son of Mason Mathews.
  - Archer Mathews (1744–c. 1796), Virginia House delegate from Greenbrier County, 1780–1782. Son of John Mathews.

== Other Mathews of Virginia ==
Other Mathews have played an important role in the public life of Virginia. Captain Samuel Matthews immigrated from England to Jamestown, Virginia around 1622, and his son Samuel Mathews (1630–1660) served as a commonwealth governor of Virginia.

Thomas Mathews (1742–1812), a speaker of the Virginia House of Delegates, immigrated from Saint Kitts, West Indies, to the Piedmont region of Virginia in the years before the American Revolution. Both Samuel and Thomas Mathews have been connected to the Mathews of Virginia by some writers and historians, though the connection has not been noted by others.

== Bibliography ==
- Chalkley, Lyman (1912). Chronicles of the Scotch-Irish Settlement in Virginia. Rosslyn, Virginia: The Commonwealth printing co. OCLC 2575649.
- Cole, J.R. (1917). History of Greenbrier County. Lewisburg, West Virginia: Lewisburg, West Virginia. OCLC 874926102.
- Combs, James Thurl (1987). Greenbrier, C.S.A. Wartime Letters of Mason Mathews to his son Captain Joseph William Mathews, C.S.A., p. 5–44. Parsons, West Virginia: The Journal of the Greenbrier Historical Society. OCLC 13983198.
- Waddell, Joseph A. (1902). Annals of Augusta County, Virginia, from 1726 to 1871. Staunton, Virginia: C. R. Caldwell. OCLC 3880311.
- Herndon, G. Melvin (1969). "George Mathews, Frontier Patriot". The Virginia Magazine of History and Biography. 77 (3): 307–328. JSTOR 4247487.
- DuPre, Flint. "U.S. Air Force Biographical Dictionary". United States Air Force.
- Gilmer, George (1855). Sketches of some of the first settlers of upper Georgia, of the Cherokees, and the author. New York: D. Appleton and company. OCLC 762195338.
- Callahan, James (1923). The History of West Virginia, Old and New, Volume II, pgs. 7-9. Chicago and New York: The American Historical Society, Inc. OCLC 42346040.
- Atkinson, George Wesley; Gibbens, Alvaro Franklin (1890). Prominent Men of West Virginia: Biographical Sketches of Representative Men in Every Honorable Vocation, Including Politics, the Law, Theology, Medicine, Education, Finance, Journalism, Trade, Commerce and Agriculture. Wheeling, West Virginia: W. L. Callin. OCLC 3886825.
- Otis, Rice (1986). A History of Greenbrier County. Lewisburg, West Virginia: Greenbrier Historical Society.
