= Buffalo Forge =

- Buffalo Forge (081-0003)
- U.S. National Register of Historic Places
- U.S. Historic district
- Virginia Landmarks Register
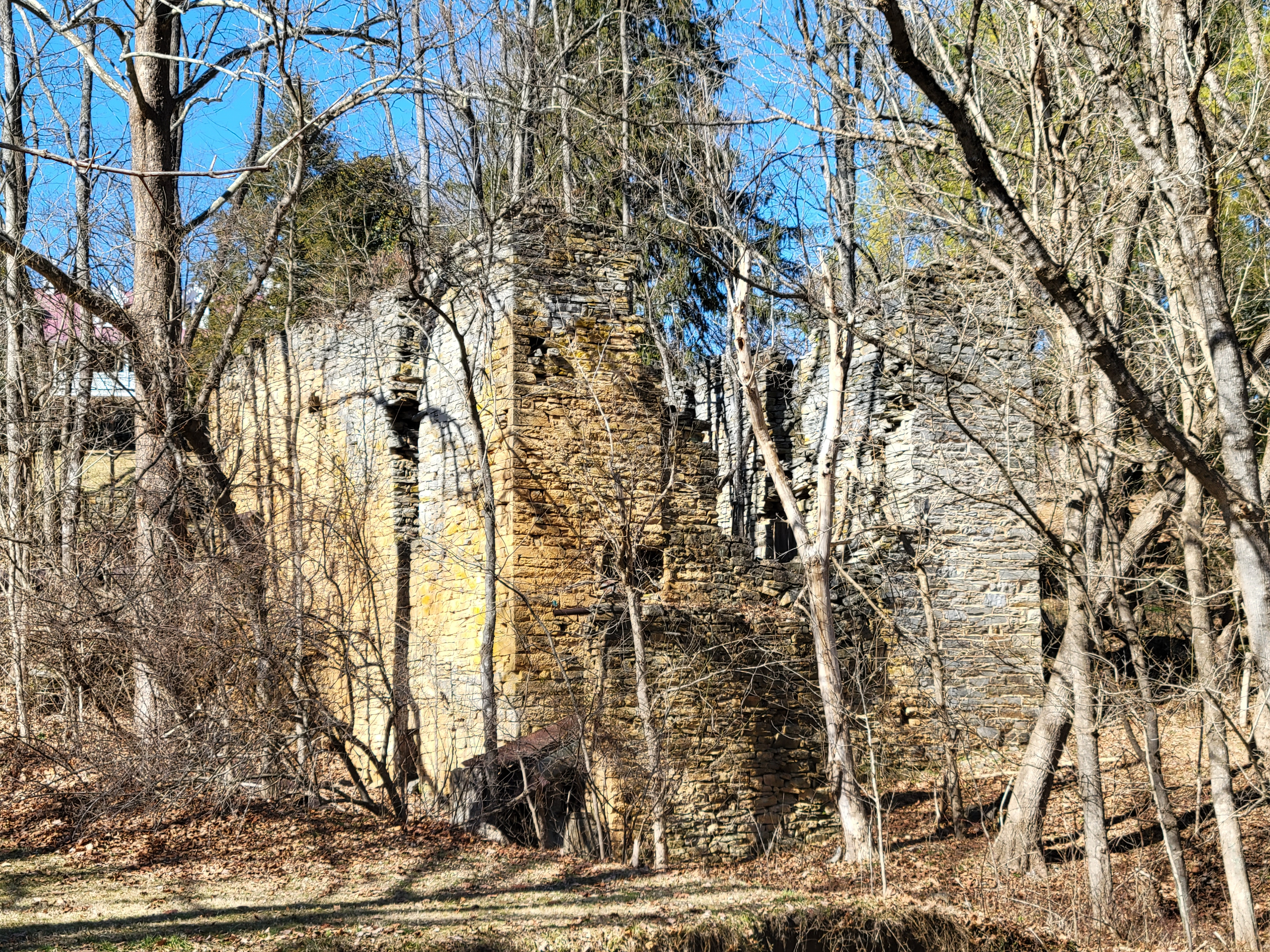
- ruins of Beggs-Weaver AKA Brady Mill (Feb. 2022)

- Location within Virginia Location within the United States
- Location: 2694 Forge Rd., near Glasgow, Virginia
- Coordinates: 37°41′12″N 79°26′11″W
- Area: 37.9 acres (15.3 ha)
- Architectural style: Federal, Gothic Revival
- NRHP reference No.: 04000551
- VLR No.: 081-0003

Significant dates
- Added to NRHP: May 26, 2004
- Designated VLR: March 17, 2004

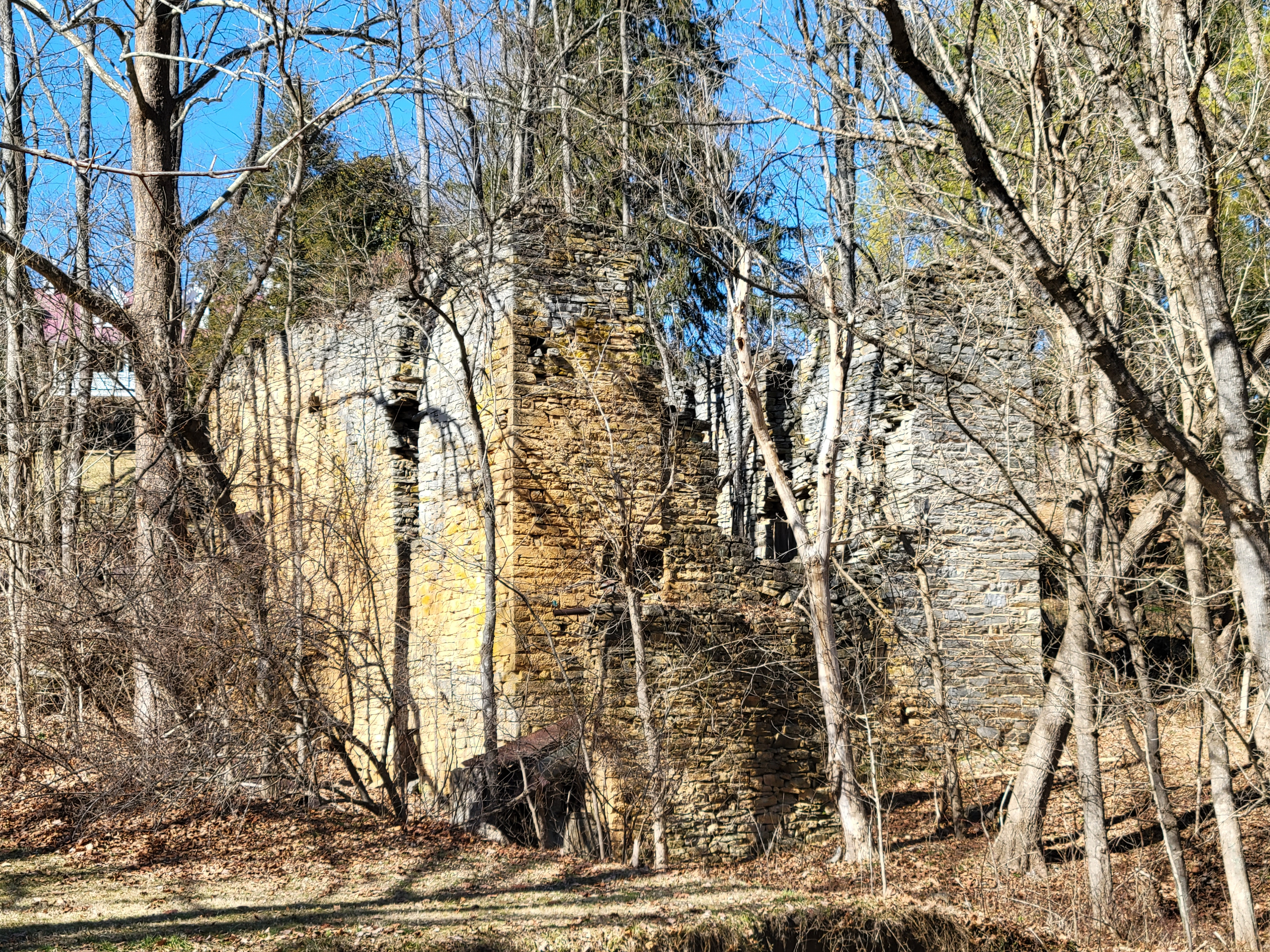
Ruins of Beggs-Weaver Mill aka Brady Mill in Buffalo Forge

Buffalo Forge, also known as the Forge Complex, is a historic iron forge complex and national historic district located near Glasgow, Rockbridge County, Virginia. The district encompasses 11 contributing buildings, 1 contributing site, and 3 contributing structures. The manor house is known as Mount Pleasant and was built in two sections of similar stone construction. The earlier section dates to about 1819, and the wing was added about 1830. A frame wing was added in the late-19th century and a kitchen wing in the early-20th century. The district also includes the contributing kitchen (c. 1820), two slave quarters (c. 1858), garage (c. 1940), spring house / dairy (c. 1820), stone cabin (pre-1865), shed (pre-1900), stables / barn (pre-1865), corn crib (pre-1920), hen house (pre-1920), and the ruins of the merchant mill and mill race. Iron production at Buffalo Forge ceased in the fall of 1868.

It was listed on the National Register of Historic Places in 2004.
