= Alexander Mathews (priest) =

Alexander Davis Mathews, D.D. (7 March 1840 – 23 March 1895) was Archdeacon of Mauritius from 1879 until his death.

Davis was born in Surrey and was educated at St John's College, Cambridge; and ordained in 1862. After curacies in Denmark Hill and Islington he went to Mauritius as Chaplain to the Bishop. Returning to England he served further curacies at Gosfield and Hanover Square. From 1869 to 1873 he was a Lecturer at St Aidan's College, Birkenhead. He again served in Mauritius from 1874: successively at Port Louis, Vacoas and Black River. He died in Mauritius.
