= Falling Spring Presbyterian Church Manse =

- U.S. National Register of Historic Places
- Virginia Landmarks Register
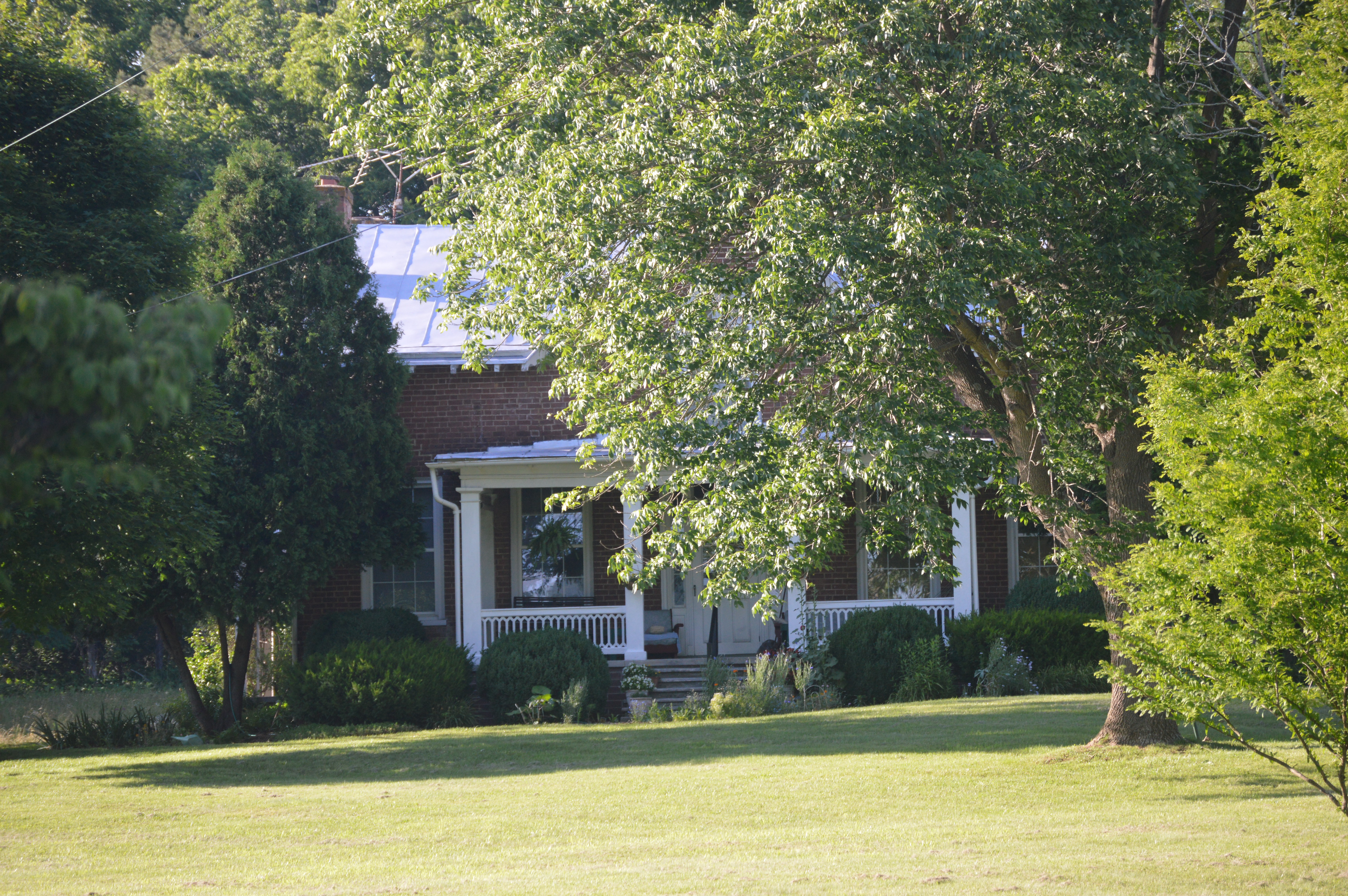
- Roadside view from the south

- Location within Virginia Location within the United States
- Location: 650 Falling Spring Rd., Glasgow, Virginia
- Coordinates: 37°41′12″N 79°27′8″W
- Area: 8.2 acres (3.3 ha)
- Built: 1857
- Built by: John G. Pole
- Architectural style: Gothic Revival
- NRHP reference No.: 05001269
- VLR No.: 081-0013

Significant dates
- Added to NRHP: November 16, 2005
- Designated VLR: September 15, 2005

Falling Spring Presbyterian Church Manse, also known as The Old Manse, is a historic Presbyterian manse located at 650 Falling Spring Road in Glasgow, Rockbridge County, Virginia. It was built in 1857, and is a 1 1/2-story, five-bay, L-shaped, Gothic Revival style brick dwelling. It has a side-gable roof and a central-passage, double-pile plan.

It was listed on the National Register of Historic Places in 2005.
