= Archer Mathews =

American politician (1744–c.1796)

Member of the Virginia House of Delegates from the Greenbrier district
- In office 1780–1782
- Preceded by: John Stuart
- Succeeded by: James Reid

Personal details
- Born: 1744 Augusta County, Virginia, British America
- Died: c.1790 Lewisburg, Virginia, U.S.
- Spouse: Letitia McLanahan
- Relations: Mathews family
- Occupation: Saddler; Legislator

Military service
- Branch/service: Virginia militia
- Battles/wars: American Revolutionary War

Archer Mathews (1744 – c. 1796) was a United States pioneer, legislator, and city founder in the colony (and later U.S. state) of Virginia. He was a member of the Virginia House of Delegates from Greenbrier County from 1780 to 1782.

== Life ==
Archer Mathews was born in 1744 in Augusta County, Virginia, to Ann (Archer) and John Mathews. His parents were among the first European settlers of Augusta County, likely having immigrated to America during the Scotch-Irish immigration of 1710–1775. His father was a notable member of the early Augusta County community, serving as a militia captain and public officer. Archer Mathews was the youngest of eleven siblings, and was a minor when his father died in 1757. He sold the land bequeathed him to a brother in 1768, and moved to the new frontier of Greenbrier County, where his brothers Sampson and George Mathews had established the area's first European trade network. He married Letitia McLanahan and had seven children.

In Greenbrier County, Mathews was saddler, and served as one of county's first magistrates, overseeing road construction, surveying the land, and holding court. On the outbreak of the American Revolutionary War, Mathews served as commissary for Fort Randolph, an American outpost erected in 1776 for defense against Indian raiding. Mathews purchased a large drove of cattle and hogs for the fort in November 1776 and delivered it through territory under regular attack from Indians. Mathews was elected to the Virginia House of Delegates from Greenbrier County for the sessions of 1780–81 and 1781–82. During the latter session he was appointed one of eight original trustees of the city of Lewisburg, Virginia (now West Virginia) on its formation, and as such he worked to develop the city and partition its land into plots to be sold. One such plot was bought by a nephew, Joseph Mathews, who was the grandfather of 5th West Virginia governor Henry Mason Mathews.

Archer Mathews died c. 1790, and was buried at the Old Stone Church in Lewisburg, West Virginia.

== Bibliography ==
- Chalkley, Lyman (1912). Chronicles of the Scotch-Irish Settlement in Virginia. Rosslyn, Virginia: The Commonwealth printing co. OCLC 2575649.
- Cole, J.R. (1917). History of Greenbrier County. Lewisburg, West Virginia: C. R. Caldwell. OCLC 874926102.
- Combs, James Thurl (1987). Greenbrier, C.S.A. Wartime Letters of Mason Mathews to his son Captain Joseph William Mathews, C.S.A., p. 5–44. Parsons, West Virginia: The Journal of the Greenbrier Historical Society. OCLC 13983198.
- Dayton, Ruth (1942). Greenbrier Pioneers and Their Homes. Charleston, West Virginia: West Virginia Publishing Company. OCLC 416281810.
- Kromkowski, C. (2005). "Virginia Elections and State Elected Officials Database Project, 1776 – 2005". Charlottesville, Virginia: University of Virginia Library.
- Peyton, John L. (1882). History of Augusta County, Virginia. Unknown: Samuel M. Yost & son. OCLC 923774044.
- Rice, Otis K. (1986). A History of Greenbrier County. Lewisburg, West Virginia: Greenbrier Historical Society. ISBN 0961750502. OCLC 15539717.
- Thwaites, Reuben (1908). The Revolution on the Upper Ohio, 1775-1777. Madison, Wisconsin: Wisconsin Historical Society. OCLC 62859772.
- Waddell, Joseph A. (1902). Annals of Augusta County, Virginia, from 1726 to 1871. Staunton, Virginia: C. R. Caldwell. OCLC 3880311.
