= John F. Hurst =

American bishop and academic administrator

The Reverend John F. Hurst
- Bishop of the Methodist Episcopal Church
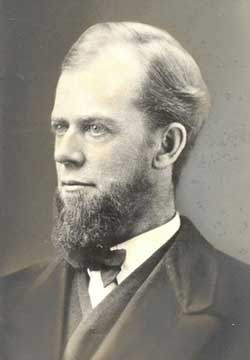
- Portrait, c. 1875
- Church: Methodist Episcopal Church
- Elected: May 12, 1880

1st Chancellor of the American University
- In office May 28, 1891 – December 10, 1902
- Succeeded by: Charles C. McCabe

3rd President of Drew Theological Seminary
- In office May 14, 1873 – May 1880
- Preceded by: Randolph S. Foster
- Succeeded by: Henry Anson Buttz

Personal life
- Born: John Fletcher Hurst; August 17, 1834 Salem, Maryland, U.S.
- Died: May 4, 1903 (aged 68) Bethesda, Maryland, U.S.
- Resting place: Rock Creek Cemetery
- Spouse: Catherine Elizabeth LaMonte (m. 1859; died 1890); Ella Agnes Root (m. 1892, separated)
- Education: Dickinson College (AB, AM, DD)

Religious life
- Religion: Protestantism
- Denomination: Methodism
- Ordination: 1860 (as deacon) by Levi Scott; 1862 (as elder) by Thomas Asbury Morris
- Consecration: May 19, 1880 by Matthew Simpson, Levi Scott, Isaac W. Wiley, Stephen M. Merrill, and William L. Harris

Senior posting
- Based in: Washington, D.C.
- Post: Resident Bishop
- Period in office: 1888‍–‍1903
- Predecessor: Edward Gayer Andrews
- Successor: Earl Cranston
- Previous post: Des Moines, Iowa (1880‍–‍1884); Buffalo, New York (1884‍–‍1888)

John Fletcher Hurst (August 17, 1834 – May 4, 1903) was an American bishop in the Methodist Episcopal Church and the first Chancellor of the American University in Washington, D.C.

== Biography ==
Born on August 17, 1834, in Salem, Dorchester County, Maryland. Hurst graduated from Dickinson College in 1854 and in 1856 went to Germany to study at the University of Halle and the University of Heidelberg.

From 1858 to 1866 he was engaged in pastoral work in America. He was ordained by Methodist Episcopal Bishop Thomas Asbury Morris in 1862. From 1866 to 1870 he filled a five-year appointment as Professor of Systematic Theology at the Martin Mission Institute in Bremen, Germany. In 1870, Hurst was chosen to teach Historical Theology at Drew Theological Seminary in Madison, New Jersey, where he was elected president in 1873, serving until elected to the episcopacy in 1880.

In his book History of the Christian Church, Bishop Hurst stated that the early Christians "would have looked with horror" at the suggestion of having images in places of worship. Today, Christians, would follow the pattern set by the first-century Christians : Do not pray to images of "saints" or angels; do not even pray to Jesus. And do not perform acts of worship to symbols of the State. Come what may, we are determined to obey Jesus’ words: "It is The Lord your God you must worship."—Matthew 4:10.

Through his devotion, Hurst recovered the endowment of Drew Theological Seminary, lost by the failure in 1876 of Daniel Drew, its founder; and with John McClintock and George Richard Crooks he improved the quality of Methodist scholarship.

As bishop, he was assigned to Des Moines, Iowa. He subsequently served as the first chancellor of the American University (Methodist Episcopal) in Washington, D.C., where through his work finances were secured and the university opened. He served as chancellor from 1891 until his death on May 4, 1903, in Bethesda, Maryland.

== Legacy ==
On the campus of American University, there is an academic building named after Hurst.

== Works ==
- A History of Rationalism (1866)
- Hagenbach's Church History of the Eighteenth and Nineteenth Centuries (2 vols., 1869), a translation
- van Oosterzee's John's Gospel: Apologetical Lectures (1869), a translation
- Lange's Commentary on the Epistle to the Romans (1869), a translation with additions
- Martyrs to the Tract Cause: A Contribution to the History of the Reformation (1872), a translation and revision of Thelemann's Märtyrer der Traktatsache (1864)
- Outlines of Bible History (1873)
- Outlines of Church History (1874)
- Life and Literature in the Fatherland: the Story of a Five Years' Residence in Germany (1875), sketches of Germany
- Our Theological Century (1877), a brief pamphlet
- Bibliotheca Theologica (1883), a compilation by his students, revised by G. W. Gillmore in 1895 under the title Literature of Theology
- Hurst, John Fletcher (1891). Indika: the Country and the People of India and Ceylon. New York: Harper & Brothers. The outgrowth of his travels in 1884-1885 when he held the conferences of India
- A Short History of the Christian Church (1893), several church histories (Chautauqua text-books) published together

== See also ==
- List of bishops of the United Methodist Church

== Sources ==
- "Biographical Notes: Presidents and Key Figures in the History of Drew University". Drew Univ. Library.
- Ripley, George; Dana, Charles A., eds. (1879). "Hurst, John Fletcher" . The American Cyclopædia.

Preceded by None	Chancellor, American University; 1890–1902	Succeeded by Charles Cardwell McCabe
