= Charles Cardwell McCabe =

American methodist leader (1836–1906)

The Reverend C. C. McCabe
- Bishop of the Methodist Episcopal Church
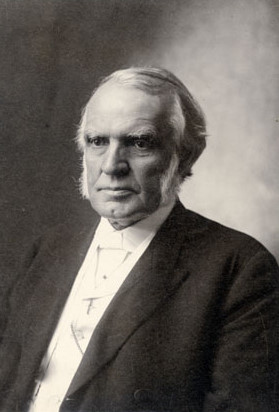
- Church: Methodist Episcopal Church
- Elected: May 19, 1896

2nd Chancellor of the American University
- In office December 1902 – December 20, 1906
- Preceded by: John F. Hurst
- Succeeded by: Franklin E. Hamilton

Personal life
- Born: Charles Cardwell McCabe; October 11, 1836 Athens, Ohio, U.S.
- Died: December 20, 1906 (aged 70) New York City, U.S.
- Resting place: Rosehill Cemetery
- Education: Ohio Wesleyan University (BA)

Religious life
- Ordination: September 23, 1860 (as deacon) by Matthew Simpson; September 7, 1862 (as elder) by Thomas Asbury Morris
- Consecration: May 26, 1896 by Thomas Bowman

Military service
- Unit: 122nd Ohio Infantry Regiment, United States Army (1862‍–‍64)

Charles Cardwell McCabe (October 11, 1836 – December 20, 1906), also known as "Bishop" C. C. McCabe and Chaplain C. C. McCabe, was an American who distinguished himself as a Methodist pastor, an Army chaplain during the American Civil War, a Church executive chiefly in the field of fundraising, as chancellor of American University, and as a bishop of the Methodist Episcopal Church (M.E.), elected in 1896. McCabe was credited by Julia Ward Howe as having popularized her famous piece "The Battle Hymn of the Republic" after his imprisonment by the Confederates in Libby Prison during the Civil War.

== Birth and family ==
Charles was born October 11, 1836, in Athens, Ohio, on the same day as bishop Isaac Wilson Joyce, another Ohio-born M.E. Bishop. Charles was the son of Robert McCabe, a tailor, and Sarah Robinson. His grandfather was also Robert McCabe, who was an early Methodist class-leader and an adviser to John Stewart, pioneer of American Methodist missions. Ancestor Owen McCabe was of Covenanter stock from County Tyrone, Ireland. He immigrated to America in the 1740s and by 1750 was located in Sherman's Valley of Cumberland County, Pennsylvania, in an area that eventually (1820) became Tyrone Township of Perry County, Pennsylvania. Charles went to the altar at eight years of age under the pleading of "Saint" Minturn. He was appointed to lead a class at age 15.

== Education ==
In 1854 Charles enrolled at Ohio Wesleyan University in Delaware, Ohio, where his uncle, Lorenzo Dow McCabe, was a distinguished professor. Although Charles withdrew from school in 1858, he graduated with a B.A. degree in 1860 and was accorded an honorary M.A. in 1864. He then became a high school principal. While studying at Ohio Wesleyan, he courted an heiress Mary Monnett who ended her relationship with him without explanation. Only years later did he learn that she had been advised by a local leading minister that her wealth would tarnish the reputation of young McCabe, who clearly was destined for greatness with his forceful, joyful manner, good looks and sanctified air. Monnett eventually went insane and McCabe encountered her in an insane asylum and learned, after all those years, the reason she had rejected him.

== Ordained ministry ==
McCabe joined the Ohio Annual Conference of the M.E. Church in 1860. He was ordained deacon by Bishop Matthew Simpson, September 23, 1860 in Gallipolis, Ohio, and elder by Bishop Thomas Asbury Morris, September 7, 1862 in Zanesville, Ohio. His career was built on his charisma as a popular and entertaining speaker and a singer with rich baritone and sparkling manner. He was very successful as a missionary and a fund raiser for the Methodist church.

== Chaplaincy ==
As the Civil War broke out, McCabe helped raise a regiment of infantry for the Union Army. By October 8, 1862 McCabe was serving as chaplain of the 122nd Ohio Infantry. He was captured by the Confederate Army and sent to Libby Prison, where he served as a chaplain to his fellow prisoners of war. During his time as a prisoner of war, McCabe learned about the Battle Hymn of the Republic, when a newspaper was slipped through the bars of the prison. Nineteenth-century newspapers featured poems and other art forms, including the lyrics to songs. Along with the lyrics to this newly written song was a notation telling readers it should be sung to the tune of "John Brown's Body Lies A-Mouldering In His Grave." McCabe liked the song, sang it, and taught it to his fellow prisoners—doctors, lawyers and other professionals—to pass the time in prison.

Later, at a meeting of the United States Christian Commission in the U.S. Capitol, he greatly impressed Lincoln, who was in attendance along with many members of Congress. About his visit to the Capitol, Jule Ward Howe's daughter Laura Elizabeth Howe Richards wrote: "Among other stirring tales, he told of the scene in Libby Prison; and once more, to a vast audience of loyal people, he sang the Battle Hymn of the Republic. The effect was magical. People sprang to their feet, wept and shouted and sang with all their might; and when the song was ended, above all the tumult was heard the voice of Abraham Lincoln, crying while the tears rolled down his cheeks, 'Sing it again!.'" Ill health later forced him to resign his chaplaincy, January 8, 1864.

== Postwar ministry ==
Following the war, as the most famous U.S.A. chaplain, he lectured all over the U.S. on "The Bright Side of Life in Libby Prison", an ever-changing motivational talk, where he joked about the vermin that crawled over them at night and made clever remarks about the lawyers who weren't such bad guys if you had to be in a prison with them. McCabe himself nearly died in prison due to the unsanitary conditions, suffering from chills and fever from the illness he contracted there, but, using black humor, joked during his talks about the treatment of himself and other prisoners. Prior to entering the episcopacy, he served on the Christian Commission, as a pastor and as the church extension secretary. He was a missionary promoter, an evangelist and a Gospel singer.

Bishop McCabe also served as chancellor of American University from December 1902 until his death in December 1906. He was especially prominent in the university's initial fundraising. Indeed, he thought of himself as "doomed to raise money," in such high demand he was as a raiser of funds for churches. Also known as Methodism's "Singing Chaplain", from coast to coast he sang "We're building two a day", a song written in response to the charge that the church was dying out, a charge made by a widely known agnostic of the day, Robert G. Ingersoll.

== Death and burial ==
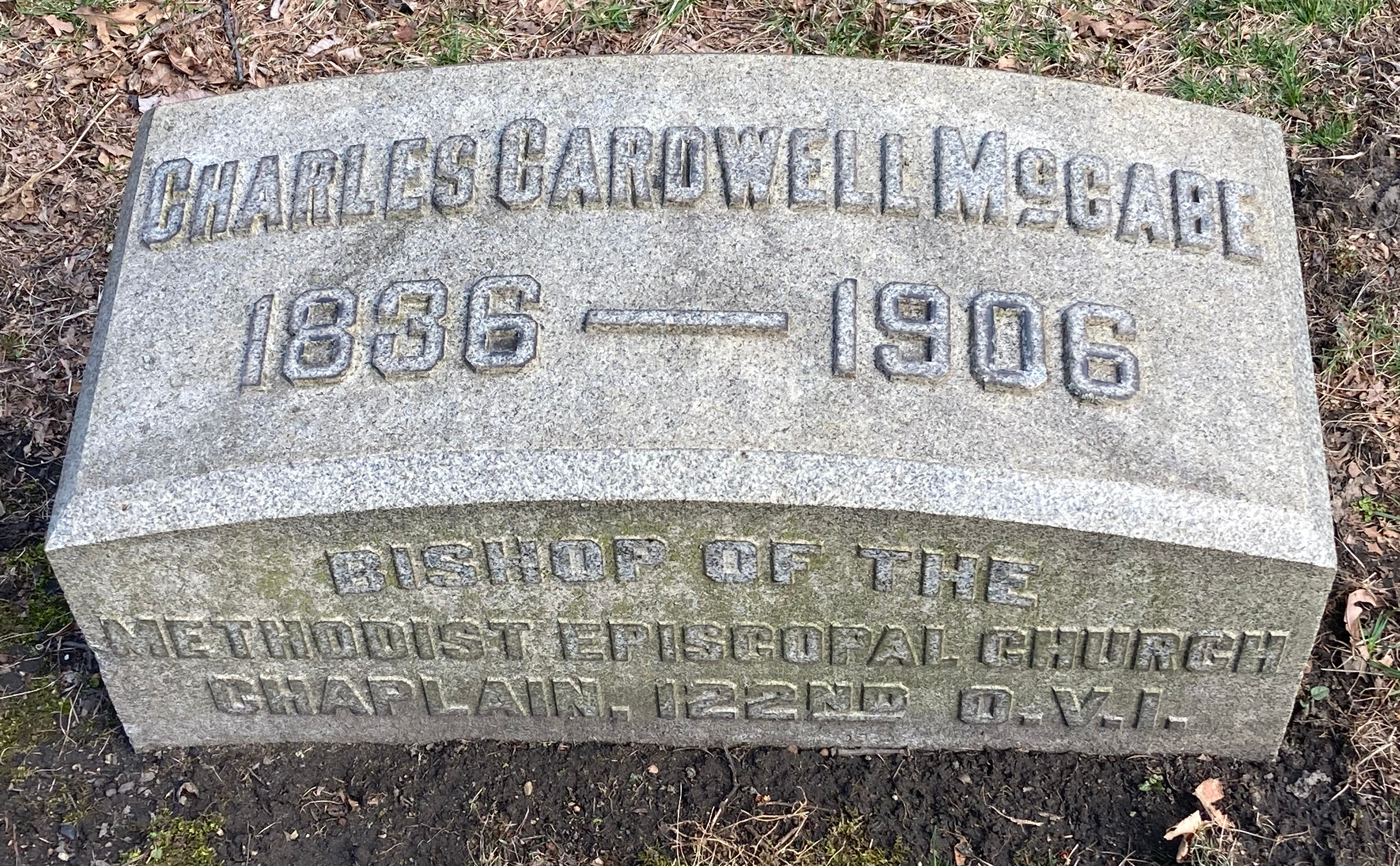
McCabe's grave at Rosehill Cemetery

Bishop McCabe fell ill in New York City after a fundraising trip to the Methodist Episcopal Church of Torrington, Connecticut. He died in New York Hospital on December 19, 1906, aged 70, and was buried in Rosehill Cemetery in Chicago.

== Selected writings ==
- Final Report on Salt Lake City Church, pamphlet, 1880.
- A Glance Backwards, pamphlet, 1886.
- The American University - Taking Our Bearings, pamphlet, 1880.
- Address: The Open Door in Latin Countries, Cleveland, First General Missionary Convention, 1903.
- Shouting, a rich little pamphlet about Christian rapture, n.d.
- Allegory, "Dream of Ingersollville".
- Winnowed Hymns, editor (with D.F. McFarlane).

== Biographies ==
- Sketch: The Battlefield Reviewed, Landon Taylor, 1881.
- Life of Chaplain McCabe, F.M. Bristol, 1908.

== See also ==
- List of bishops of the United Methodist Church

Preceded by John Fletcher Hurst	Chancellor, American University; 1902–1906	Succeeded by Franklin E. Hamilton
