= John William Hamilton =

American bishop (1845–1934)

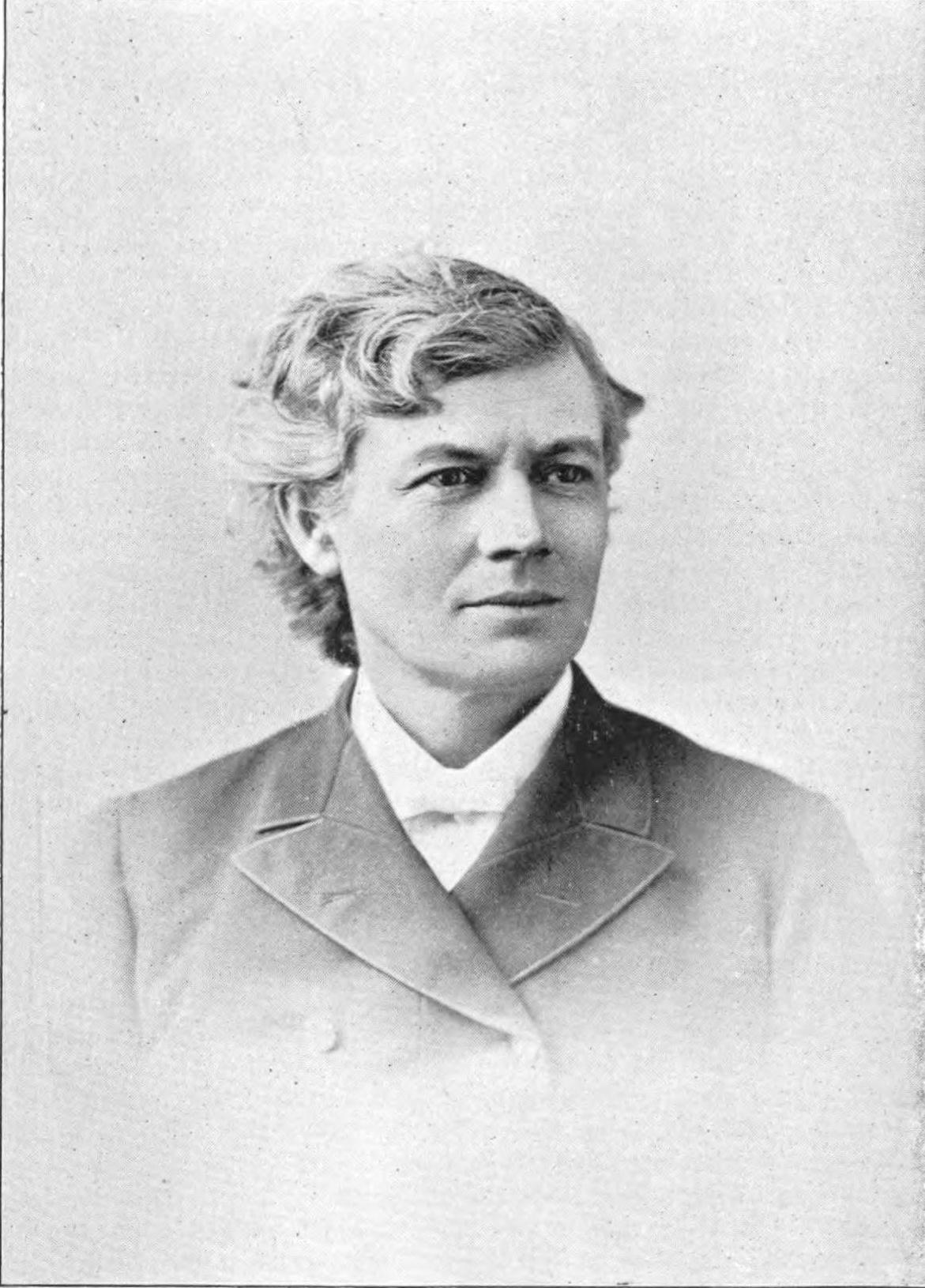
- Born: March 18, 1845; Weston, Virginia
- Died: July 24, 1934 (aged 89)
- Spouses: Julia Elizabeth Battelle (m. 1873; died 1883) Emma Lydia Battelle (m. 1888; died 1915)
- Relatives: Franklin Elmer Ellsworth Hamilton (brother)
- Religion: Christian (Methodist)
- Church: Methodist Episcopal Church

John William Hamilton was an American bishop of the Methodist Episcopal Church, elected in 1900. He was the chancellor of American University from 1916 until 1922. He was the older brother of Franklin Elmer Ellsworth Hamilton, who was also both a Methodist Bishop and the Chancellor of American University.

== Birth and family ==
John was born March 18, 1845, in Weston, Virginia (now West Virginia). He was the son of the Rev. William Cooper Patrick and Henrietta Maria (Dean) Hamilton. William was a respected clergy member of the Pittsburgh Annual Conference of the M.E. Church. He served churches in western Pennsylvania, western Virginia and eastern Ohio.

John Hamilton was married twice. In 1873 he married Julia Elizabeth Battelle of Covington, Kentucky. She died in 1883. In 1888 he married her sister, Emma Lydia Battelle. She died in 1915. Hamilton was the father of two children, one from each marriage.

== Education and military service ==
After attending Summerfield Academy, John Hamilton taught school at the age of fifteen (the locations of the academy and the school are unknown). In April 1861 he attempted to enlist in the Union Army, but was rejected because of his age. Later he did serve with General Don Carlos Buell's troops in Kentucky (dates unknown).

John graduated in 1865 with a BA from Mount Union College, Alliance, Ohio. In 1871 he graduated with an STB from the Boston University School of Theology.

== Ordained ministry ==
The Rev. John Hamilton was Licensed to Preach in 1865. He was received on trial in the Pittsburgh Conference in 1866. He was appointed to the Newport Circuit in Ohio (1866–68). He was ordained Deacon in 1868 by Bishop Calvin Kingsley. That same year Hamilton transferred his ministerial membership to the New England Annual Conference, where he was ordained Elder in 1870 by Bishop Levi Scott.

The Rev. John Hamilton was appointed Pastor of several congregations in Massachusetts, including Maplewood (1868–70), Somerville (1870–72 and again 1884–88), First Methodist Church in Boston (1872–75), People's Church in Boston (1875–84) and East Boston (1888–1892).

Hamilton's pastorate at People's Church was especially noteworthy because he was responsible not only for its founding, but also for its development into the largest Methodist congregation in Boston. Moreover, it was Hamilton's intent from the outset that this church be open to everyone, regardless of social standing, race, or national origin.

== Denominational service ==
Beginning in 1892, Hamilton was elected corresponding secretary of the Freedmen's Aid and Southern Education Society, an agency of the M.E. Church created after the American Civil War to establish and maintain educational institutions in the southern U.S. for the benefit of freed slaves and other underprivileged youth. At the same time, being held in high esteem by his ministerial colleagues, Rev. Hamilton was elected a delegate to M.E. General Conferences, 1884–1900.

John Hamilton was an eloquent advocate of temperance and the rights of African Americans and women. Indeed, as a General Conference delegate in 1892 he proposed a change to the Constitution of the Methodist Episcopal Church that ultimately made it possible for women to serve as delegates to that same body.

Throughout his varied ministries, Rev. Hamilton was an author and an editor.

== Episcopal ministry ==
John William Hamilton was elected to the episcopacy by the 1900 General Conference of the M.E. Church. He was assigned as Resident Bishop in San Francisco (1900–08). After the devastating earthquake of 1906, he organized the reconstruction of M.E. work in that city. First, by a national tour to raise funds for paying down all debts on M.E. properties, then raising the funds locally to rebuild every Methodist sanctuary. Hamilton United Methodist Church, designed by architect Julia Morgan in the famous Haight/Ashbury District, was named for the "Phoenix Bishop" who helped raise the City Spirit from the ashes: "Together we will rebuild this city, one neighborhood at a time!" He was also a pioneer in establishing Methodism in Alaska and Hawaii.

Bishop Hamilton was next assigned Resident Bishop in Boston (1908–16), where he was responsible for his denomination's ministry throughout New England. In 1916, upon reaching the mandatory retirement age of an M.E. Bishop, Hamilton succeeded his brother Franklin as Chancellor of American University in Washington, D.C.. During John's six-year administration the university's academic program improved and its financial undergirding became more sound. In 1922 he was appointed Chancellor Emeritus. During these same years, Bishop J.W. Hamilton also was a leader in raising funds for the restoration of John Wesley's living quarters at Lincoln College, Oxford.

== An Evaluation of His life ==
Charles Yrigoyen, Jr., in his American National Biography Online article on Bishop Hamilton, offers this evaluation:

During his lifetime Bishop Hamilton, known for his effective preaching, wise administration, and ecumenical leadership, was one of the most influential figures in the Methodist Episcopal church. He was recognized as a progressive regarding the social issues that confronted his nation and as a leader in the world Methodist community. He addressed the important world Methodist Ecumenical Conferences in London (1901) and Toronto (1911). Hamilton was winsome, energetic, and intelligent. His "striking face, flowing hair, booming voice, and erect, soldierly bearing" made him an impressive figure (Earl and Godbold, p. 1063).

== Death and burial ==
Bishop Hamilton died July 24, 1934, in Boston. He was buried at Forest Hills Cemetery in Boston.

== Selected writings ==
- Memorial of Jesse Lee and the Old Elm (1875).
- The People's Church (1877).
- Lives of Methodist Bishops (1882).
- The People's Church Pulpit (1884, 1885).
- American Fraternal Greetings to the Wesleyan Conferences in Ireland and England (1898).
- Gordon Battelle, Preacher, Statesman, Soldier (1916).

== Biographies ==
- Bucke, Emory Stevens, editor, The History of American Methodism, vol. 3, 1964.
- Godbold, Albea and Earl, Jesse A., John William Hamilton in Encyclopedia of World Methodism, vol. 1, 1974, pp. 1062–63.
- Journal of the Thirty-second Delegated General Conference of the Methodist Episcopal Church, 1936, pp. 685–88.
- Obituary, in the Minutes of the Annual Conferences of the Methodist Episcopal Church, Spring 1934.
- Obituary, Zion's Herald, August 1, 1934.

== See also ==
- List of bishops of the United Methodist Church

Methodist Church titles
Preceded by John Philip Newman	Methodist Episcopal Bishop of San Francisco; 1900–1908	Succeeded by Edwin Holt Hughes
Preceded by Daniel Ayres Goodsell	Methodist Episcopal Bishop of Boston; 1908–1916	Succeeded by Edwin Holt Hughes
Academic offices
Preceded by Franklin E. Hamilton	Chancellor, American University; 1916–1922	Succeeded by Lucius C. Clark
