= Isaac Wilson Joyce =

American bishop in the Methodist Episcopal Church (1836–1905)

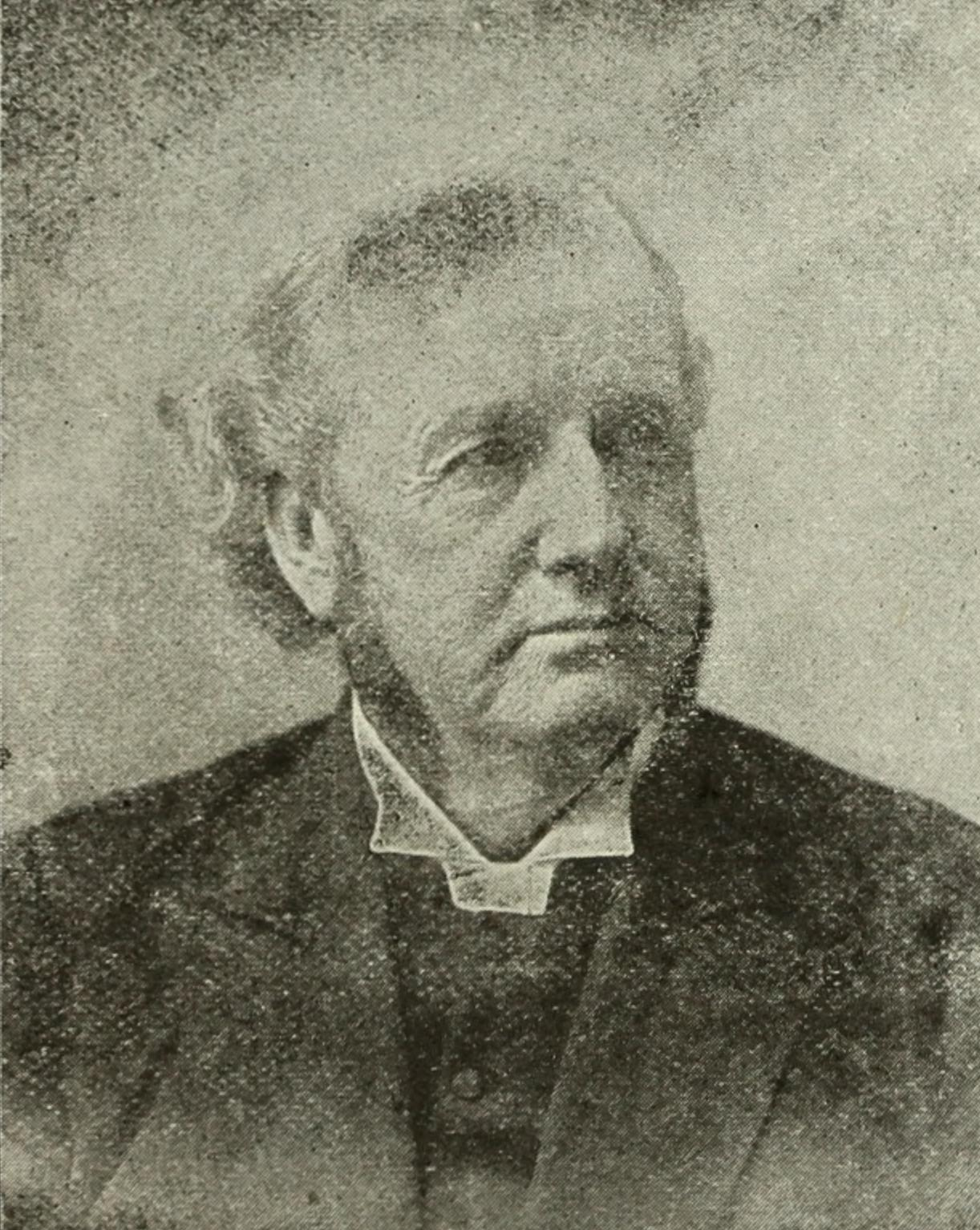
- Portrait of Joyce (c. 1902)
- Church: Methodist Episcopal Church
- Elected: 1888

Personal details
- Born: October 11, 1836 Colerain Township, Hamilton County, Ohio, U.S.
- Died: July 28, 1905 (aged 68) Minneapolis, Minnesota, U.S.
- Buried: Lakewood Cemetery; Minneapolis, Minnesota, U.S.
- Spouse: Caroline Walker Bosserman (m. 1861)
- Children: 2
- Education: Hartsville College
- Alma mater: Asbury University (M.A.)

Isaac Wilson Joyce (October 11, 1836 – July 28, 1905) was an American bishop in the Methodist Episcopal Church, elected in 1888.

== Early life ==
Isaac Wilson Joyce was born in Colerain Township, Hamilton County, Ohio on October 11, 1836, to James Wilson Joyce. His father was a farmer. At the age of thirteen, in April 1850, Joyce and his family moved to Indiana. He joined the United Brethren Church. Joyce attended Hartsville College from 1854 to 1856, but left college to assist with the family's photograph business. He later completed college and graduated with a Master of Arts from Asbury University (now DePauw University) in 1872.

== Career ==
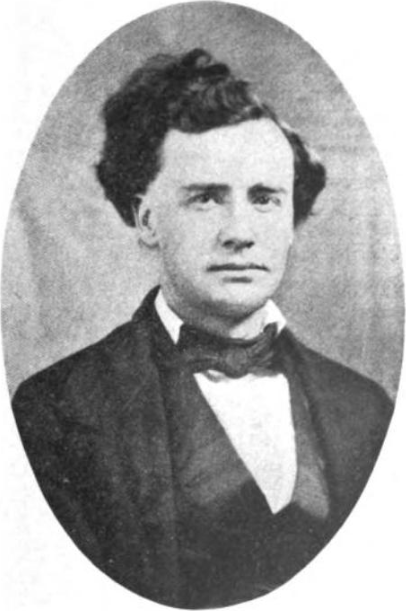
Joyce at the age of 22

In June 1858, Joyce was a preacher at the United Brethren Church and joined the Methodist Episcopal Church. He became a member of the Northwest Indiana Annual Conference of the M.E. Church in September 1859. He was ordained deacon in 1861 by Bishop Matthew Simpson, and an elder by Bishop Thomas Asbury Morris. Around 1867, Joyce became the presiding elder of the Lafayette district. In 1873, Joyce became the pastor at Trinity Church in Lafayette. He worked there for three years.

In October 1876, Joyce became pastor of Bethany Church, a church in Baltimore, Maryland, affiliated with his wife's cousin Charles J. Baker. He remained in Baltimore until the fall of 1877. He was offered to remain with the church, but he declined since the church would not become a regular Methodist church. In 1877, Bishop Edward Raymond Ames arranged for Joyce to join Meridian Street United Methodist Church in Indianapolis, but ultimately Joyce returned to his old conference. In September 1877, Joyce was appointed to Roberts Chapel in Greencastle. He briefly accepted an appointment at Trinity Church in Louisville, Kentucky. In September 1880, Joyce moved to Cincinnati, Ohio. He became a pastor at St. Paul Church in 1880 and served as pastor of Trinity Church from 1883 to 1886. He then returned to St. Paul and remained there until 1888.

Joyce was elected as bishop in May 1888. After becoming bishop, Joyce moved to Chattanooga, Tennessee. He remained there for eight years. He also served as chancellor of U.S. Grant University. In June 1896, Joyce moved to Minneapolis, Minnesota, and preached at Hennepin Avenue United Methodist Church. He then supervised conferences in Japan, Korea and China until April 1898. From 1902 to 1904, Joyce visited conferences in South America.

== Personal life ==
Joyce married Caroline Walker Bosserman of La Porte, Indiana, on March 20, 1861. They had two sons, Frank Melville and Wilbur Bruce. Wilbur Bruce died at the age of fourteen months. Their son Frank Meville was a captain in the Second Ohio Battery. Joyce lived in Minneapolis later in life.

In 1875, Joyce suffered a severe illness diagnosed as "congestion of the brain". He died on July 28, 1905, in Minneapolis and is buried in Lakewood Cemetery of that city.

Joyce spelled his last name as "Joice" until 1863.

== Awards and honors ==
Around 1876 Joyce received the degree of Doctor of Divinity from Dickinson College, and in 1891 he received the degree of Doctor of Laws from the University of the Pacific.

== See also ==
- List of bishops of the United Methodist Church
