= Hurst Robins Anderson =

American educator (1904–1989)

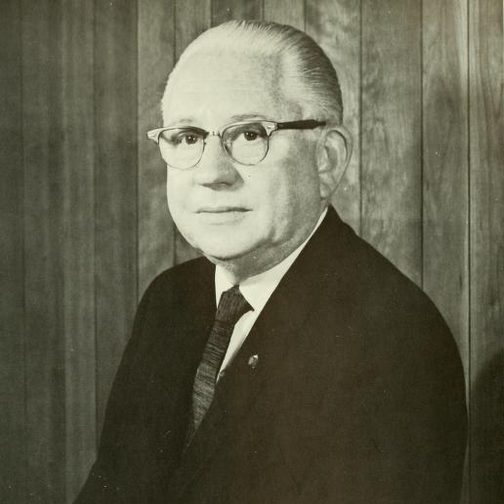
- Anderson in the 1966 Talon yearbook

8th President of American University
- In office September 1, 1952 – June 1968
- Preceded by: Paul Douglass
- Succeeded by: George H. Williams

10th President of Hamline University
- In office July 1, 1948 – September 1, 1952
- Preceded by: Charles Nelson Pace
- Succeeded by: Walter Castella Coffey

7th President of Centenary Junior College
- In office August 15, 1943 – July 1, 1948
- Succeeded by: Edward W. Seay

Personal details
- Born: September 16, 1904 Cleveland, Ohio, U.S.
- Died: April 19, 1989 (aged 84) St. Petersburg, Florida, U.S.
- Spouse: Marian Powell (m. 1932)
- Education: Ohio Wesleyan University (BA); Northwestern University (MA)

Hurst Robins Anderson (September 16, 1904 – April 19, 1989) was an American educator and academic administrator. He was president of Centenary Junior College (now Centenary University), Hamline University, and American University, for various periods between 1943 to 1968.

Anderson, who earned degrees from Ohio Wesleyan University and Northwestern University, taught at Allegheny College from 1929 until his installation as president at Centenary. At Centenary and Hamline, he oversaw renovations and constructions of academic, residential, and recreation facilities, and raised funds to do so at both schools. He took office at American in September 1952 and prioritized administrative and curricular restructuring as early priorities. He proposed two large-scale development plans, which helped expand and upgrade campus and added to the school's endowment, at the cost of tens of millions of dollars each. He grew American considerably—full-time student enrollment grew from 500 to over 3,000 during the course of his term and the size of the faculty more than doubled—and the school hosted Presidents Eisenhower and Kennedy for commencement addresses in 1957 and 1963, respectively. He retired in 1968 and died in St. Petersburg, Florida, in 1989.

== Early life and education ==
Hurst Robins Anderson was born on September 16, 1904, in Cleveland, Ohio. He was named for John Fletcher Hurst. He earned a Bachelor of Arts degree in political science from Ohio Wesleyan University (OWU) in 1926. There, he was a member of the Sigma Alpha Epsilon fraternity. After leaving OWU, he began studies at the University of Michigan Law School, but he did not complete his degree due to lack of funds. After leaving Michigan, he enrolled at Northwestern University and graduated with a Master of Arts degree in speech in 1928.

== Career ==
=== Early career and first presidencies, 1929–1952 ===
Anderson's career in academia began in 1929, when he took a position as a professor at Allegheny College, in Meadville, Pennsylvania, teaching debate and English. He was also the college registrar during part of his time at Allegheny. In May 1932, he was the commencement speaker at Plumville High School in Pennsylvania. He accepted the presidency of Centenary Junior College (now Centenary University) in Hackettstown, New Jersey, on June 29, 1943, and he assumed office on August 15 of that year. Early into his term, he appointed Margaret Hight to be the school's new dean; she had previously been assistant dean. On October 24, 1945, Anderson participated in the inauguration ceremony for his brother, Paul R. Anderson, as the new president of the Pennsylvania College for Women (now Chatham University). Anderson's administration announced an $800,000 (equivalent to $13.2 million in 2025) fundraiser in April 1946, with funds primarily to be used in improving existing campus facilities and constructing several new buildings, including a gym and dormitory. Of the amount sought by the fundraiser, the school aimed to raise $300,000 (equivalent to $5 million in 2025) by July 1947; Anderson announced that this mark had been exceeded in late December 1946. Earlier that year, he had been elected president of the New Jersey Association of Colleges for a two-year term.

Anderson accepted the presidency of Hamline University, in St. Paul, Minnesota, in May 1948, effective July 1, 1948. His successor at Centenary was Edward W. Seay, elected by the trustees late that July. Anderson's formal inauguration at Hamline was held October 23, 1948. At Ohio Wesleyan's 1949 commencement ceremonies, Anderson and his brother, also an alumnus of the school, were awarded honorary Doctor of Laws degrees. Several months earlier, Anderson announced plans to spend $2 million (equivalent to $27.1 million in 2025) to renovate multiple buildings on Hamline's campus and built numerous others, including science, arts, and recreational facilities, and a women's dormitory. The plans were timed to coincide with the university's 100th anniversary. The school received a $515,000 donation in December 1949 (equivalent to $7 million in 2025) from a fund organized by a Minneapolis attorney; Anderson announced the money would go towards new classrooms or laboratory spaces.

=== American University, 1952–1968 ===
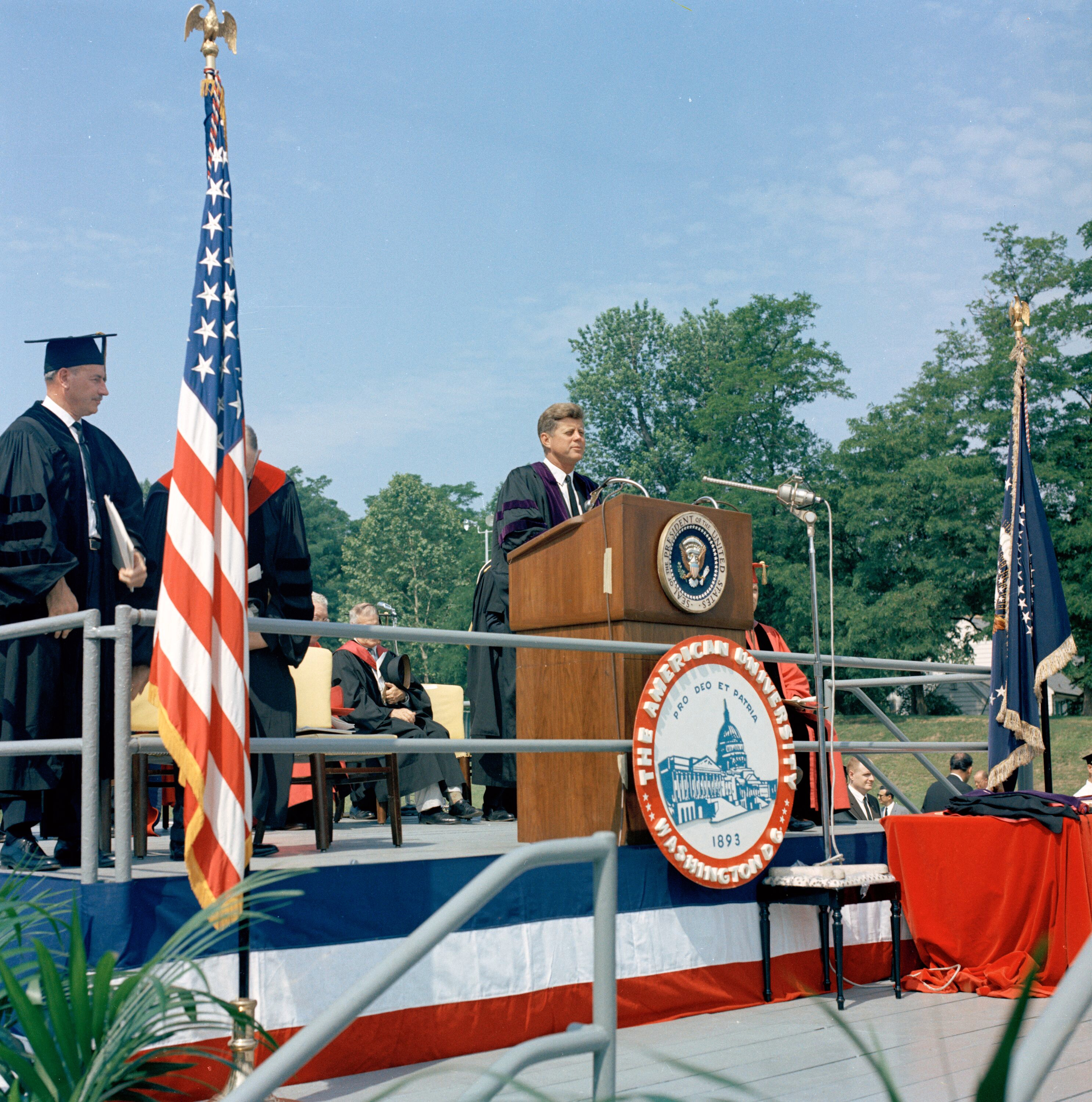
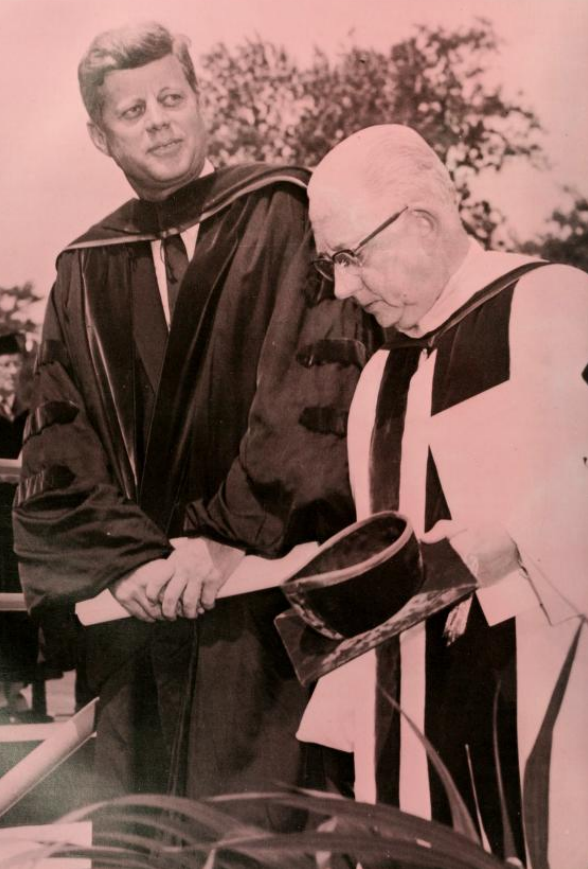
Left: U.S. president John F. Kennedy giving his "American University speech" as AU's commencement speaker on June 10, 1963
Right: Kennedy and Anderson during the commencement ceremony

Anderson was announced as the incoming president of American University, in Washington, D.C., on June 7, 1952. He took office on September 1, 1952, and was the school's first lay president. Before taking office, he remarked that changes to the undergraduate curriculum and administrative reform would be priorities of his administration; his predecessor, Paul Douglass, resigned after the school received criticism from an accreditation agency regarding its administrative practices. He also reaffirmed his opposition to the university reestablishing its football program, which had been disbanded following the 1941 season. He was inaugurated as American's president in February 1953; during his inaugural address, he announced a proposal for a $10 million development plan (equivalent to $120 million in 2025) to be completed over a 10-year period; the proposal called for half of the funds to be put towards new campus buildings—for law, social science, and public affairs, among others—and half to be put towards the school's endowment. That month, his administration also announced a reformation to the curriculum for new students starting with the 1953–1954 academic year. During the latter half of that year, American was approved for membership in the American Association of University Women and received a $100,000 gift (equivalent to $1.2 million in 2025) from the estate of benefactor Mary Graydon. Around this time, American opened its School of International Service; Anderson later said that this was his greatest accomplishment.

After originally deciding to retain a law professor who had admitted to having been a Communist Party member, Anderson reversed course and announced in September 1955 that the professor's contract would not be renewed. He received criticism for this decision from congressman Gordon H. Scherer of the House Un-American Activities Committee but denied that he had been pressured to change his mind, particularly by the Methodist bishop Garfield Bromley Oxnam, a trustee of American. Later that year, Anderson was named chairman of the Advisory Corrections Council by U.S. attorney general Herbert Brownell Jr. American broke ground on a school of international service at the conclusion of the 1956–1957 academic year; the groundbreaking ceremony was held after the commencement exercises and both were attended by U.S. president Dwight D. Eisenhower. Anderson presented an honorary Doctor of Laws degree to Eisenhower, who addressed the crowd at the groundbreaking ceremony. Anderson attended the White House Conference on Children and Youth in 1960. His administration announced another campus improvement project in December 1960, at a cost of $36 million (equivalent to $392 million in 2025), with funds to be put towards new academic buildings for the sciences, business administration, arts, and law programs, in addition to a chapel and dormitories. The same semester, AU announced a record enrollment of 8,519 students.

In March 1963, Anderson was elected president of the Association of American Colleges after having been the association's vice president the year prior. Several months later, Anderson introduced U.S. president John F. Kennedy prior to his commencement address, during which Kennedy spoke out against nuclear weapons testing. A new dormitory scheduled to open at the beginning of the 1966–1967 academic year was named Anderson Hall in his honor. On April 29, 1967, Anderson announced that he would resign as American's president effective in June 1968. Over the course of his 16 years in office at AU, the school's enrollment grew from 300 to over 5,000 full-time students and the number of faculty members more than doubled, from 326 to 661. Upon his resignation, he became American's honorary chancellor.

== Personal life and death ==
Anderson married Marian Powell, a teacher from Norwalk, Ohio, on August 24, 1932. The wedding ceremony was held in Ashland, Ohio. He died at the age of 84 from bone cancer in St. Petersburg, Florida, on April 19, 1989. (Note: The "Hurst R. Anderson Papers" collection housed at American University claims that Anderson died on April 15, 1989.)

== Notes ==
Academic offices
Preceded by	President of Centenary Junior College; 1943 — 1948	Succeeded by
Preceded by Charles Nelson Pace	President of Hamline University; 1948 — 1952	Succeeded by Walter Castella Coffey
Preceded by Paul Douglass	President of American University; 1952 — 1968	Succeeded by George H. Williams
Other offices
Preceded by James F. Kelley as President of Seton Hall University	President of the New Jersey Association of Colleges; May 1946 — May 1948	Succeeded by Evald Benjamin Lawson as President of Upsala College
Preceded by George M. Modlin as President of the University of Richmond	President of the Association of American Colleges; March 1963 — February 1965	Succeeded by Carter Davidson as President of Union College
