= Van Oosterzee =

van Oosterzee is a Dutch toponymic surname of Oosterzee. Notable people with the surname include:

- Cornélie van Oosterzee (1863–1943), Dutch pianist and composer
- Jan Jacob van Oosterzee (1817–1882), Dutch theologian
