= Franklin Elmer Ellsworth Hamilton =

American priest and historian

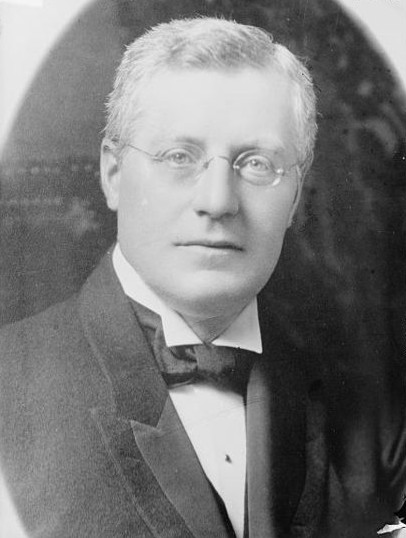
- Born: August 9, 1866; Pleasant Valley, Ohio, U.S.
- Died: May 4, 1918 (aged 51)
- Spouse: Mary Mackie Pierce (m. 1895)
- Children: 3
- Relatives: John William Hamilton (brother)
- Religion: Christian (Methodist)
- Church: Methodist Episcopal Church

Franklin Elmer Ellsworth Hamilton (August 9, 1866 in Pleasant Valley, Ohio – May 4, 1918) was an American bishop of the Methodist Episcopal Church, elected in 1916.

== Birth and family ==
Franklin was the son of the Rev. William Patrick and Henrietta (Dean) Hamilton. His middle name honors Union officer Elmer Ellsworth. He married Mary Mackie Pierce April 25, 1895. They had the following children: Edward Pierce, Arthur Dean, and Elisabeth Louise.

Hamilton was the younger brother of John William Hamilton, also a bishop of the Methodist Episcopal Church.

== Education ==
Franklin graduated from the Boston Latin School in 1883. He then earned the A.B. degree at Harvard University in 1887. He went on to earn the S.T.B. degree (1892) and the Ph.D. degree in 1899 at Boston University. He was also elected Phi Beta Kappa. Hamilton continued his education with three years of post-graduate work at Berlin University, Germany, and in Paris, France.

== Ordained and academic ministry ==
Hamilton entered the New England Annual Conference of the M.E. Church in 1891. He was appointed to East Boston. He then became the pastor at Newtonville. His final pastorate was First Methodist of Boston.

Hamilton made a tour around the world in 1904–1905 in support of student missions He was elected a delegate to the M.E. General Conferences of 1908–1916, as well as the Ecumenical conference of 1911. He also was the president of the Old South Historical Society of Boston.

In 1907 Hamilton became the chancellor of the American University, Washington, D.C., serving in this position until elected to the episcopacy in 1916. He served as a trustee of American before being elected chancellor. His office was located at 1422 F St., N.W. in Washington, D.C. He maintained two homes: at the Hotel Hamilton in Washington, and in Milton, Massachusetts.

== Episcopal ministry ==
Hamilton was elected to the episcopacy of the Methodist Episcopal Church at the 1916 General Conference of that denomination. He served as resident bishop in Pittsburgh, Pennsylvania, from then until his death in 1918.

== Selected writings ==
- Why Did the Pilgrim Fathers Come to America
- 250th Anniversary Founding of Harvard University
- 200th Anniversary of the Birth of John Wesley
- Cup of Fire, Methodist Book Concern, 1914.
- contributions to magazines.

== See also ==
- List of bishops of the United Methodist Church

Preceded by Charles Cardwell McCabe	Chancellor, American University; 1907–1916	Succeeded by John W. Hamilton
