= Joseph Long (bishop) =

American bishop

Joseph Long (1800–1869) was the third bishop of the Evangelical Association, elected at the General Conference of 1843. He was born in Dauphin County, Pennsylvania, a son of Kilian and Barbara Long.

== Early life ==
For twelve years the family resided in Allegheny County, Pennsylvania, then in 1817 settled on a tract of government land a few miles north of Lisbon, Ohio, in Columbiana County. Here the family was brought into the Evangelical Association by the first Circuit riders of the Canton, Ohio Circuit. Joseph was converted to the Christian faith in 1818.

Joseph married Catharine Hoy in 1826. They settled in the vicinity of his parental home, at what became known as Long's Crossing. This was Joseph's only dwelling place during his entire career. He was a typical pioneer minister, owning and operating a farm during most of his years as a Circuit Rider, Presiding Elder, and Bishop.

The Long home was a gateway between the East and West, and it stood as a typical wayside lodging place for ministers in their travels to and from conference sessions in Pennsylvania throughout this early pioneer period. It was a welcome home for the itinerants in Ohio and the meeting place of the Long Class for many years.

== Early ministry ==
Joseph entered the Traveling Ministry of the Evangelical Association in 1822, the first pastoral recruit from this pioneer Evangelical work in Ohio. During 1827, the first year of the history of the Western Conference of the Evangelical Association, Joseph and the Rev. Adam Klinefelter shared the responsibilities of attending to the Ohio preaching fields. Joseph was the first elected Presiding Elder of the Western Conference, overseer of the Ohio work 1828-33.

In 1833 he felt the urgent need of giving more attention to his home and family. For the next ten years, Joseph was a model local preacher, living at home and preaching only in the immediate neighborhood.

Joseph reentered the active ranks of Traveling Ministry in 1843. In the same year he was re-elected as Presiding Elder. He served on the Tabor District until October 1843 when the General Conference chose him as the third Bishop of the Evangelical Association.

== Biographical reflections ==
A. Stapleton, in a biography of Bishop Long, states:

"Bishop Long was in every way a remarkable man. In the pulpit he was a master... Sometimes he became impressively grand and eloquent in his discourses. He was one of the profoundest thinkers the church has ever had. With mental endowments of the highest order and a life of very close fellowship with God, he was able to present the truth with overwhelming force and power. At conference sessions his sermons were especially impressive and powerful.

In 1857, at the session of the East Pennsylvania Conference in New York City, he preached an ordination sermon from Acts 20:28. This sermon was described by hearers as having been overwhelmingly grand and impressive. The great deep of almost every heart was broken up. 'Fathers in Israel' wept like children, and many vows of fidelity were recorded in heaven as the result of that sermon."

== Death and memorial ==
After Bishop Long died in June 1869, the Ohio Conference of the Evangelical Association in 1870 passed the following resolution:

"Whereas, his departure falls especially heavily on us, as a conference, as he for many years dwelt among us and gave us counsel as a devoted father would to his children in whom he had delight, and in whose welfare he had the deepest interest, therefore, Resolved, That...we will highly prize his good advice so often given us, and cherish his persevering and self-sacrificing spirit in the cause of the church, and the work of the Master. May the mantle of Bishop Long rest upon us and may we have still more of that loyalty and self-denying spirit which he as our leader ever evinced in the interest of our beloved Zion."

== See also ==
- List of bishops of the United Methodist Church

Preceded by Thomas Asbury Morris	Ohio United Methodist Bishops; 1836	Succeeded by Matthew Simpson
