= Joseph M. M. Gray =

American academic administrator and Methodist minister

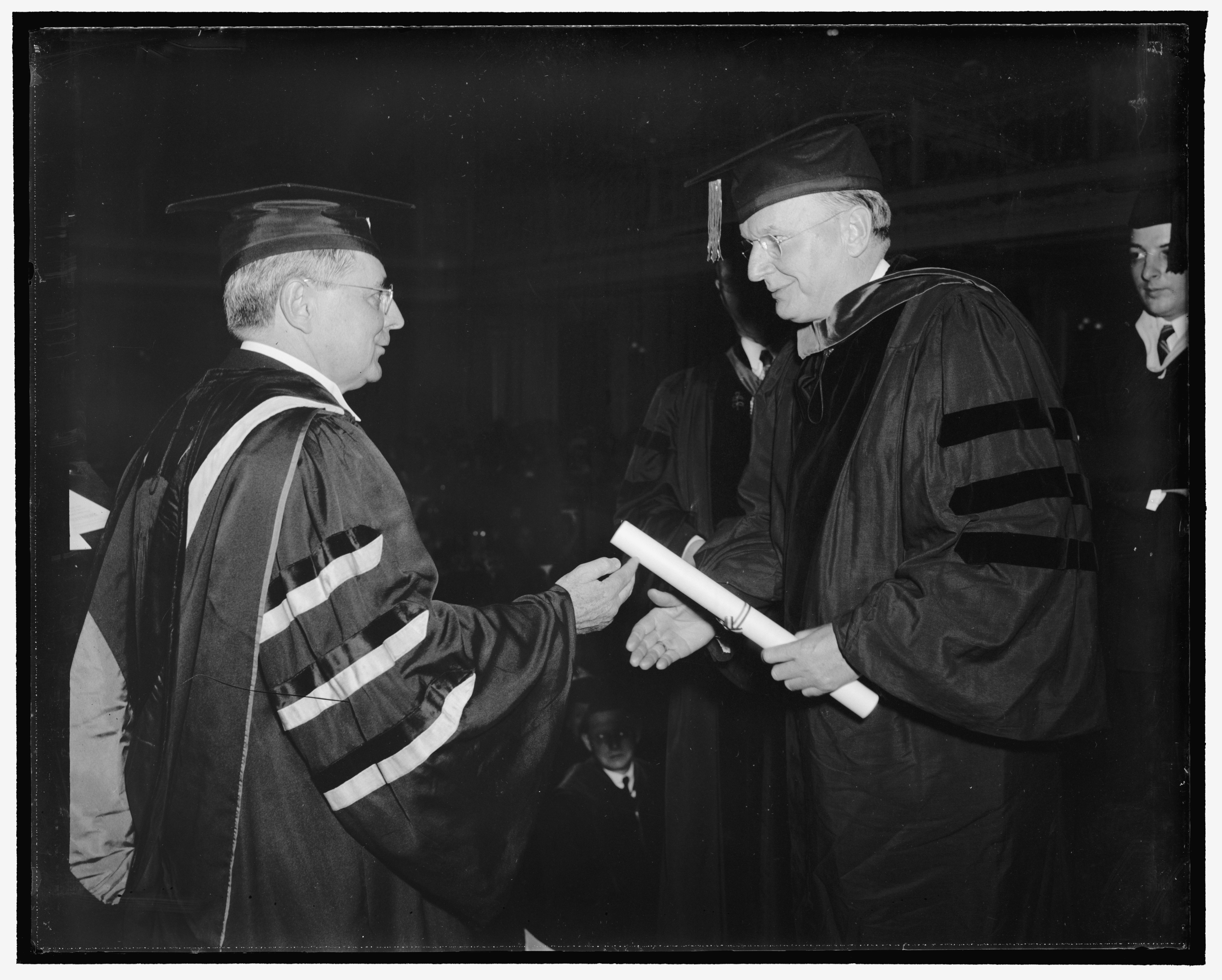
- Gray, (left) with Senator Burton K. Wheeler (right).

Chancellor of American University
- In office 1933–1941

Joseph M. M. Gray (1877 – January 10, 1957) was an American Methodist minister who was Chancellor of American University from 1933 until 1941. He was the last Chancellor of the university, after which the title of the office was changed to President.

Academic offices
Preceded by Lucius C. Clark	Chancellor, American University; 1933–1941	Succeeded by Paul Douglass
