= Roberts Park Methodist Episcopal Church =

Historic church in Indiana, United States

- Roberts Park United Methodist Church
- U.S. National Register of Historic Places
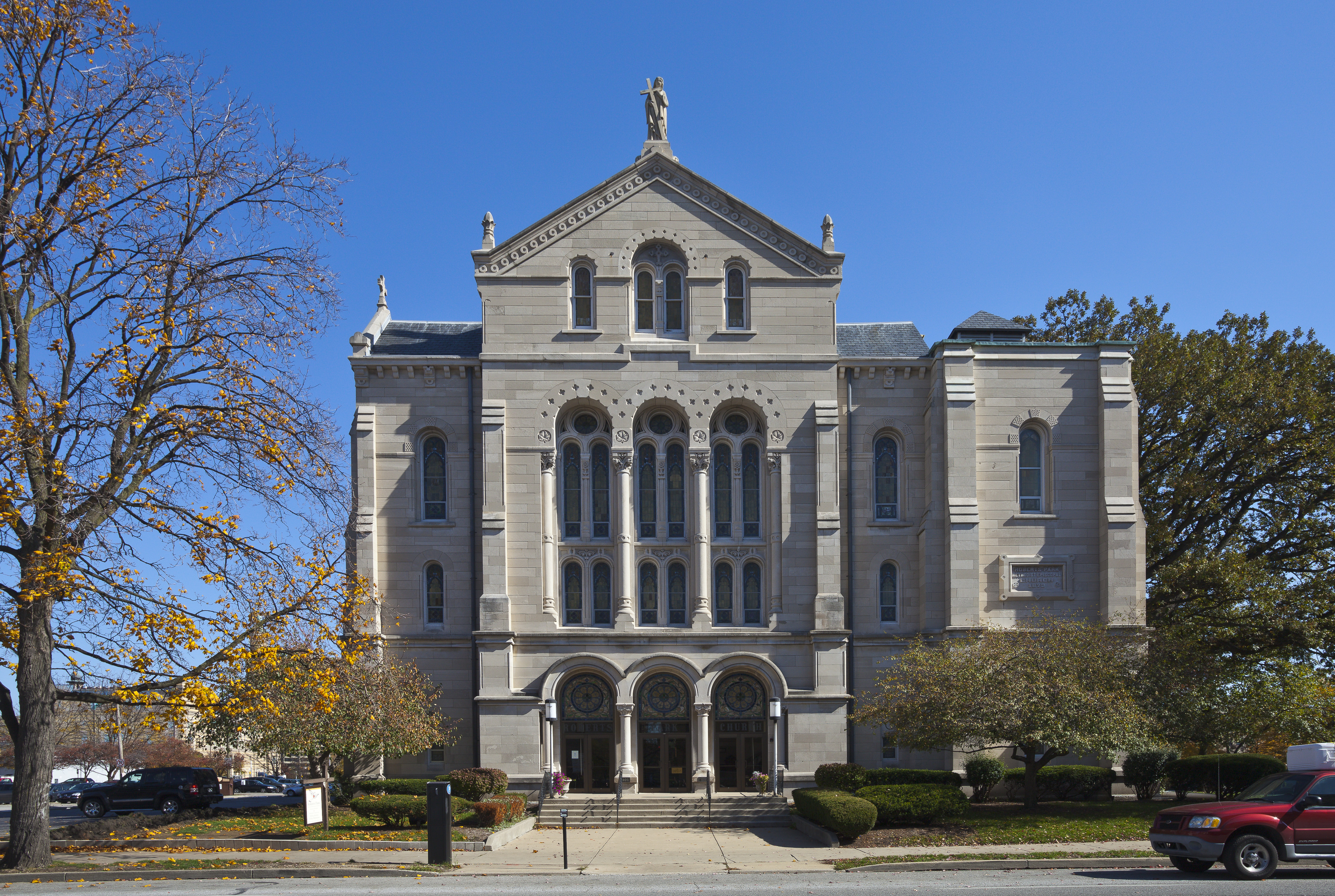

- Location within Indianapolis Location within Indianapolis Location within Indiana Location within the United States
- Location: 401 N. Delaware St., Indianapolis, Indiana
- Coordinates: 39°46′22″N 86°09′14″W
- Built: 1869–1876
- Architect: Diedrich A. Bohlen
- Architectural style: Romanesque Revival
- NRHP reference No.: 82000069
- Added to NRHP: August 19, 1982

Roberts Park Methodist Episcopal Church, whose present-day name is Roberts Park United Methodist Church, was dedicated on August 27, 1876, making it one of the oldest church remaining in downtown Indianapolis. Diedrich A. Bohlen, a German-born architect who immigrated to Indianapolis in the 1850s, designed this early example of Romanesque Revival architecture. The church is considered one of Bohlen's major works. Constructed of Indiana limestone at Delaware and Vermont Streets, it has a rectangular plan and includes a bell tower on the southwest corner. The church is known for its interior woodwork, especially a pair of black-walnut staircases leading to galleries (balconies) surrounding the interior of three sides of its large sanctuary. The church was added to the National Register of Historic Places on August 19, 1982. It is home to one of several Homeless Jesus statues around the world, this one located behind the church on Alabama Street.

The Roberts Park Methodist church originates from the first Methodist congregation organized in Indianapolis in 1822. After the congregation divided into two groups in 1842, one group established Roberts Chapel at Market and Pennsylvania Streets in 1843. Following the American Civil War, the congregation decided to build a new church at its present-day site at Delaware and Vermont Streets. The church is named in honor of Methodist bishop Robert R. Roberts and its park-like location. Construction on the new building began in 1869, but due to financial limitations, it was not completely finished until 1876.

== History ==
=== Origins ===
The Roberts Park church originates from the first Methodist congregation organized in Indianapolis in 1822. Its members initially worshipped in a log structure on Maryland Street that was also used as a schoolhouse. The congregation's first church building, called Wesley Chapel, was a brick structure completed in 1829 at the southwest corner of Governor's Circle, which later became known as Monument Circle.

In 1842, when the city's Methodist congregation reached 600 members, it divided into two smaller groups, a western and an eastern charge, using Meridian Street, a major north–south thoroughfare, as a boundary line for the new congregations. The western charge maintained a Methodist church on the Circle until 1869. The congregation subsequently relocated to new church buildings along Meridian Street and eventually became known as the Meridian Street United Methodist Church. Its present-day building at 5500 North Meridian Street opened in 1952. The eastern charge established Roberts Chapel, named in honor of Bishop Robert R. Roberts, the first Methodist bishop to live in Indiana.

Construction on Roberts Chapel at the northeast corner of Market and Pennsylvania Streets began in 1843. Completed in 1846, it cost an estimated $1,300 for the lot and $11,000 for the structure. In 1848 the congregation purchased a new bell for the chapel's tower. It called worshippers to religious services and also served as the community's fire bell. A town clock was added to the bell tower in 1853.

=== Present-day church ===
After the American Civil War Roberts Chapel members decided to build a new church. On June 29, 1868, the congregation purchased approximately 1 acre (0.40 hectares) of land at the northeast corner of Delaware and Vermont Streets for $17,000. The congregation sold Roberts Chapel and held its last worship service there on July 5, 1868.

On August 9, 1868, at a service held in a temporary building erected at the congregation's new site at Delaware and Vermont Streets, Roberts Chapel's members decided to name their new church the Roberts Park Methodist Episcopal Church, in reference to Bishop Roberts and its park-like grounds. The present-day church is known as Roberts Park United Methodist Church. The building was dedicated in 1876, and serves as the fourth home of Indianapolis's original Methodist congregation.

The foundation for the present-day church was laid in 1869; its cornerstone was laid on May 14, 1870. Construction on the upper story, delayed for financial reasons, began in 1873. The completed church was dedicated on August 27, 1876, making it one of the oldest churches remaining in downtown Indianapolis. The total cost of the new church was estimated at $128,000, including the lot, structure, interior decoration, and an organ. The building debt was not repaid until 1900.

Roberts Park church was the site of a series of historic revivals In 1881, 1886, and 1896. The congregation also established several women's groups during this time, including the Woman's Home Missionary Society (1895) and the Women's Social and Business Union (1894). The church's youth alliance became an Epworth League in 1888.

In 1927 Fermor S. Cannon designed a $100,000 addition to the east end of the church. Another major remodeling in 1950 cost $200,000 and included rebuilding a first-floor chapel, installation of stained-glass windows on the eastern wall of the church, and modification of the gymnasium in the church addition. During 1971–73, around the time of the congregation's 150th anniversary, the sanctuary and other areas of the church were redecorated and renovated. The congregation also purchased a new pipe organ.

Roberts Park Methodist Episcopal Church was added to the National Register of Historic Places on August 19, 1982.

== Description ==
=== Exterior and plan ===
Diedrich A. Bohlen, a German-born architect who immigrated to Indianapolis in the 1850s, designed the new church in the Rundbogenstil (round-arch) style that was popular at the time he was studying architecture in Germany. Bohlen, the founder of D. A. Bohlen, Architect, was already known as the designer of other notable projects in Indiana, including the Morris-Butler House and Saint John the Evangelist Catholic Church (rectory and church) in Indianapolis and the motherhouse and chapel for the Sisters of Providence of Saint Mary-of-the-Woods. The Roberts Park church, one of Bohlen's major works, is reportedly modeled on City Temple, London.

Bohlen's design for the church is an early example of Romanesque Revival architecture, which blends classically influenced architectural styles resembling buildings of the Romanesque period. Roberts Park church includes a rectangular plan with a three-story bell tower on its southwest corner. The church's exterior is constructed of Indiana limestone. A tall spire was planned for the tower, but it was never built.

The church's main facade, which faces Delaware Street, is divided into three sections with recurring, round-arched openings in arcades. The large, center section is flanked by two smaller sections containing narrow, round-arched, stained-glass windows on three levels. The ground-floor arcade consists of compound arches that contain the entry doors surmounted by stained-glass rose windows. A stone-belt course separates the ground floor from the two upper floors. The second level has a two-story arcade with a series of three arches, each one is two stories high. These arched openings feature smaller, round-arch windows on each level. A belt course separates this arcade from the gable, which features a frieze and finials with three stone-carved crosses at the gable stops. A stone statue of Saint Mary is installed at the roof peak.

The bell tower has rounded-arch windows at the first and third level. The second level has a tablet inscribed with the church's name and its construction date. A pyramid-shaped room tops the tower, which houses the church's bell.

The addition built in 1927 at the east end of the church includes design elements similar to the original structure, including its round-arch windows.

=== Interior ===
The church's two-floor interior is known for its large sanctuary and woodwork of oak and black walnut. The main floor includes a large sanctuary and a large pair of black-walnut staircases that lead to galleries (balconies) surrounding the interior of three sides of the sanctuary, which measures 62 feet (19 m) by 84 feet (26 m) feet. The sanctuary, with a seating capacity of 1,200 people, has no interior support columns and is 34 feet (10 m) in height. The lower level (basement) housed classrooms and rooms used for various purposes. An addition constructed in 1927 at the building's east end provided additional space that originally included a parlor, classrooms, a gymnasium, and a stage. During a renovation in 1950 the gymnasium was divided and remodeled into offices, classrooms, and other spaces. An elevator was also installed.

The church's interior decoration changed over time, especially after several major renovations. Electric chandeliers were installed in 1892. The congregation spent $65,000 in 1916 to refurbish the interior and the church organ, and an additional $45,000 in 1945 on painting and repairs. Renovations in the early 1970s included the purchase of a 2,273-pipe organ.

== Mission ==
Robert Park was a sponsor of other church congregations. By the 1860s it had sponsored eight, and eighteen more by the 1960s. During World War II the church provided entertainment to servicemen and women and served them more than 90,000 meals. The church also sponsored several missionary groups. It continues to serve the needs of the city's elderly population and the downtown Indianapolis community.

== Membership ==
In 1843 the eastern charge reported 322 members. By 1849 its membership had risen to 407. By 1940 the Roberts Park church, with an estimated 1,700 members, had become one of Indiana's largest Methodist congregations. As Indianapolis's population extended outward to suburban neighborhoods, the church's membership declined, dropping to 425 members by 1990; however, the congregation resolved to remain in its downtown location.

=== Notable members ===
- James A. Allison (1872–1928), a business entrepreneur and founding partner of the Indianapolis Motor Speedway.
- Calvin Fletcher (1798–1866), an early resident of the city who was active in business and community affairs
- James B. Ray (1794–1848), a former governor of Indiana

== Worship services ==
- Sunday worship services: 8:30 a.m. and 10:30 a.m.
- Wednesday worship services 12:10 p.m.

== See also ==
- National Register of Historic Places listings in Center Township, Marion County, Indiana
