= Lucius C. Clark =

Lucius C. Clark (June 4, 1869, in Grundy County, Iowa – March 27, 1949, in Washington, D.C.) was Chancellor of American University from 1922 until 1932.

Clark received a Bachelor of Arts degree from Cornell College in 1893, and was ordained a minister in the Methodist Episcopal Church. From 1894 to 1913, he was pastor of several Methodist churches in Iowa.

In 1913, Clark moved to Washington and became pastor of the Hamline Methodist Church. He was Executive Secretary of the Washington Federation of Churches from 1920 to 1922. After his service as American University chancellor from 1922 to 1932, he became Dean of the Graduate School and Director of the School of Political Science before retiring in 1934.

Preceded by John W. Hamilton	Chancellor, American University; 1922–1932	Succeeded by Joseph M.M. Gray
