= Paul Douglass =

American academic administrator

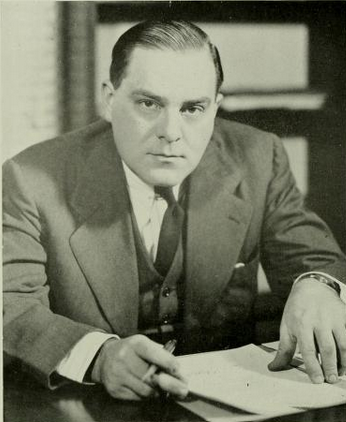
- Douglass in the 1948 Aucola yearbook

7th President of American University
- In office 1941–1952
- Preceded by: Joseph M. M. Gray
- Succeeded by: Hurst Robins Anderson

Member of the Vermont Legislature
- In office 1933–1943

Personal details
- Born: November 7, 1904 Corinth, New York, U.S.
- Died: August 7, 1988 (aged 83) Rutland, Vermont, U.S.
- Education: Wesleyan University; University of Cincinnati
- Awards: Order of Merit for National Foundation

Paul Frederick Douglass (November 7, 1904 – August 7, 1988) was an American educator, politician, and academic administrator. He was president of American University from 1941 until 1952. His ascent to the office marked a change in the title from chancellor to president. Douglass was a graduate of Wesleyan University and received masters and doctoral degrees from the University of Cincinnati. He was also an adviser to Syngman Rhee, President of South Korea, from 1952 to 1956 and a member of the Vermont Legislature from 1933 to 1943.

== Early life ==
Paul Frederick Douglass was born on November 7, 1904, in Corinth, New York. He earned a Bachelor of Arts degree from Wesleyan University and graduated from the University of Cincinnati with a Ph.D. in 1931.

== Personal life and death ==
Douglass never married. He died on August 7, 1988, at Rutland Regional Medical Center in Rutland, Vermont.

Academic offices
| Preceded by Joseph M. M. Gray | President, American University; 1941–1952 | Succeeded by Hurst Robins Anderson |
