= Edward Raymond Ames =

American bishop (1806–1879)

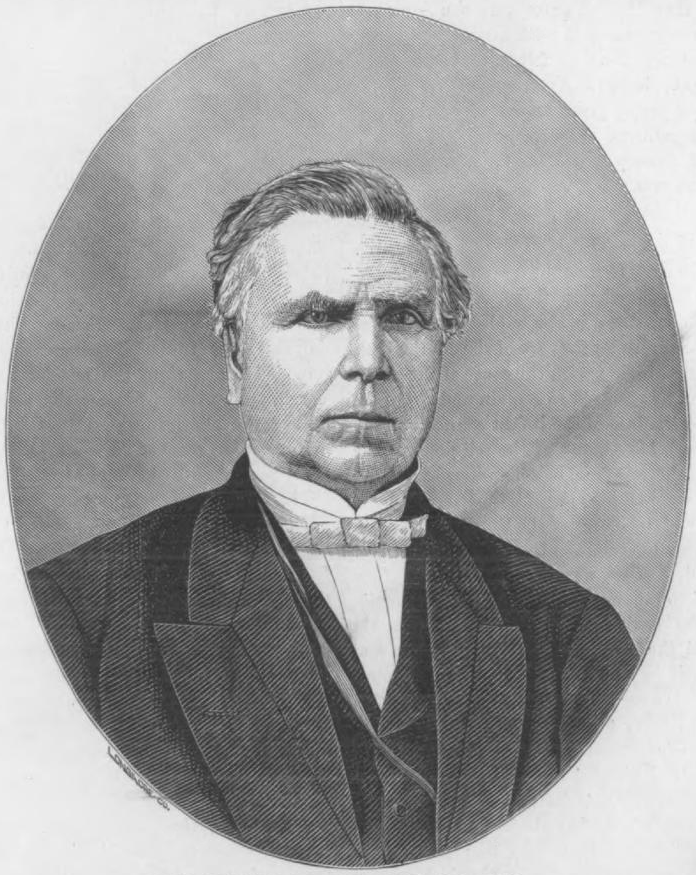
- Born: May 20, 1806; Amesville, Ohio, U.S.
- Died: April 25, 1879 (aged 72); Baltimore, Maryland, U.S.
- Resting place: Green Mount Cemetery
- Occupation: Methodist Episcopal bishop

Edward Raymond Ames (May 20, 1806 – April 25, 1879) was an American Bishop of the Methodist Episcopal Church, elected in 1852.

== Birth and family ==
Ames was born in Amesville, Athens County, Ohio, one of three Methodist Episcopal Bishops to be born in Athens County.

== Education and ministry ==
At age 20, Ames became a student at Ohio University at Athens. During his student years he united with the M.E. Church (August 1827). In 1828 he opened a high school in Lebanon, Illinois which later became McKendree University. He taught there until 1830, when he became a pastor in the Illinois Annual Conference. He was licensed to preach by the circuit rider (and presiding elder), Peter Cartwright. He was ordained deacon in 1832 and elder in 1834.

Upon the organization of the Indiana Conference in 1832, Ames joined that body, serving the majority of his active pastoral life in the State of Indiana (with the exception of two years spent in St. Louis), until becoming a bishop.

Ames was elected a delegate to the General Conference of the Methodist Episcopal Church held in Baltimore in 1840, and was there elected Corresponding Secretary of the M.E. Missionary Society, with responsibilities for the South and West. When the Church South broke with the Church North over slavery, he remained with the M.E. Church. He received the degree of A.M. in 1844 from the State Indiana University. The Rev. Ames was subsequently elected Delegate to General Conferences in 1844 and 1852.

== Native American work ==
Ames traveled extensively, especially visiting the Indian Missions of his denomination along the northern lakes and on the western frontier. He aided in establishing mission schools among the various tribes west of Arkansas. In 1848 he officiated as chaplain to a Council of Choctaws, being the first chaplain chosen by an Indian Assembly.

Ames was elected president of Indiana Asbury University in 1848, as well. But he declined the position, preferring to remain in more active ministerial work.

== Episcopal ministry ==
Ames was elected to the episcopacy of the Methodist Episcopal Church by the 1852 General Conference. He thereafter traveled extensively through all the U.S. States and Territories. His first visit to the Pacific coast was 1852–53.

Ames was a firm supporter of the Union during the American Civil War. Though offered positions of influence, he declined them that he might be free for ecclesiastical duties. For example, when the United States government seized the property of the Methodist Episcopal Church, South (in Southern United States), Ames was put in charge of the confiscated property by President Abraham Lincoln and Secretary of War Edwin M. Stanton. Such confiscation resulted in complaints of unconstitutional governmental involvement in religion.

== Death and burial ==
Ames died on April 25, 1879, in Baltimore, Maryland. He is buried in Green Mount Cemetery in that city.

== See also ==
- List of bishops of the United Methodist Church

Preceded by Matthew Simpson	Ohio United Methodist Bishops; 1852	Succeeded by Randolph Sinks Foster
