= Levi Scott (bishop) =

American bishop of the Methodist Episcopal Church (1802–1882)

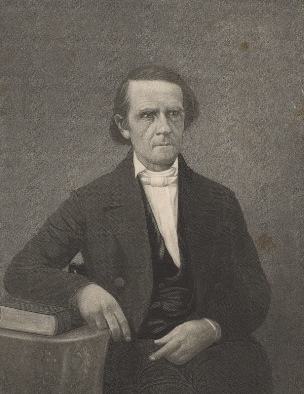
- Born: October 11, 1802; Odessa, Delaware, U.S.
- Died: July 13, 1882 (aged 79); Odessa, Delaware
- Occupation: Minister
- Known for: Bishop of the Methodist Episcopal Church

Levi Scott (October 11, 1802 – July 13, 1882) was an American bishop of the Methodist Episcopal Church, elected in 1852.

== Early life ==
Scott was born near Cantwell's Bridge, now Odessa, Delaware. His parents were Methodists, his father a class-leader and local preacher who entered the Itinerant Ministry of the Philadelphia Annual Conference in 1803. Scott labored on a farm until his sixteenth year, when he began a mechanical occupation.

== Ordained ministry ==
Converted in 1822 and licensed to preach in 1825, Scott joined the Philadelphia Conference the following year. He was appointed, successively, to ministries in Talbot, Dover, St. George's Charge, Philadelphia, and West Chester. In 1832, on account of impaired health, he became a supernumerary. The following year he resumed his work. In 1834, he was unexpectedly appointed presiding elder of the Delaware District.

Scott continued to fill pastoral charges until, in 1840 he accepted the position of principal of the Dickinson Grammar School, Carlisle, Pennsylvania. He served in this position for three years before returning again to pastoral work, which was more to his taste. He was a trustee of Dickinson College from 1858 to 1882.

Scott was elected a member of every General Conference of the M. E. Church from 1836 to 1852. In 1844, he voted with the North in the debate over slavery that split the Methodist Church. The 1848 General Conference elected him the assistant book agent of the Methodist Book Concern in New York City.

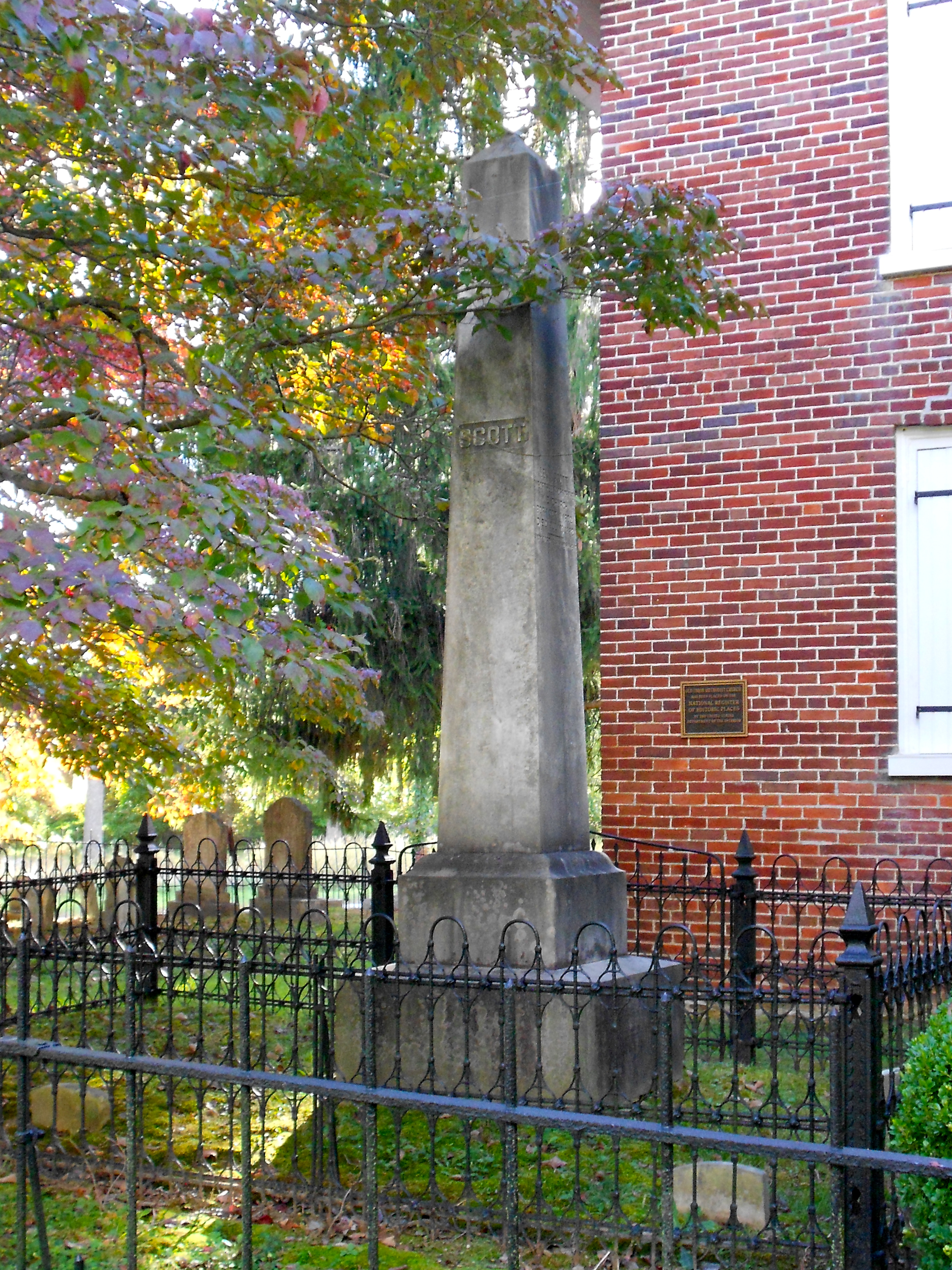
Grave of Bishop Levi Scott

== Episcopal ministry ==
Scott was elected to the episcopacy of the Methodist Episcopal Church by the 1852 General Conference. As a bishop he traveled extensively through all the states and territories in which his denomination was active. The year after his election, Scott sailed for Africa, visiting the missions and presiding at the session of the Liberia Annual Conference. He also visited the conferences on the West Coast of the United States three times, established the Wyoming Conference in 1852, and formed the Washington M. E. Conference during the Civil War, with the goal of attracting African Americans and their churches. In December 1866, Scott convened and chaired a meeting that resulted in the founding of a Black seminary that would become Morgan State University. He served as the senior bishop of the M. E. Church until his death, following the death of Bishop Thomas Asbury Morris in 1874.

== Death ==
Scott suffered a stroke in 1880 and died in Odessa, Delaware, on July 13, 1882, at the age of 79. He was buried in the Union Methodist Church graveyard in Townsend, Delaware.

== See also ==
- List of bishops of the United Methodist Church
