= Robert Richford Roberts =

American Methodist circuit rider, pastor, presiding elder and bishop

- Born: August 2, 1778; Frederick County
- Died: March 26, 1843 (aged 64); Lawrence County

Robert Richford Roberts (August 2, 1778 – March 26, 1843) distinguished himself as an American Methodist circuit rider, pastor, presiding elder, and bishop of the Methodist Episcopal Church, elected in 1816. He was the first married man in America to serve as bishop of the Methodist Episcopal Church.

== Early life ==
Roberts was born in Frederick County, Maryland. His father was of Welsh and his mother of Irish ancestry. They were communicants of The Church of England. In 1785 the family moved to the Ligonier Valley, Westmoreland County, Pennsylvania. Roberts united with the M.E. Church when he was fourteen years old. Until he was twenty-one his was a thoroughly frontier existence, with few books and quite simple habits. Yet early on he commenced with study, all the while being drawn gradually toward the ministry.

== Ordained ministry ==
After much hesitation, owing to great timidity, Robert preached his first sermon in 1801. He was licensed as a local preacher at the Holmes Meeting-house near Cadiz, Ohio.

In the spring of 1802 he was received on trial in the Baltimore Annual Conference, and appointed to a circuit including Carlisle, Pennsylvania, and twenty-nine other preaching appointments in Western Pennsylvania, Maryland and Ohio. He was ordained, both deacon and elder, by Bishop Francis Asbury. It took as long as a month to visit the entire circuit. Roberts studied constantly. In 1804 a senior colleague reported that "his moral character was perfect and his head a complete magazine."

He was then sent by Bishop Asbury to Baltimore, where he reluctantly went, as he doubted his being suited to city congregations. Subsequently, Rev. Robert filled appointments in Baltimore, Alexandria, Virginia; Georgetown, and Philadelphia. In 1815 he was appointed presiding elder of the Schuylkill District of the Philadelphia Annual Conference. Owing to the death of Bishop Asbury, Rev. Roberts was elected to preside over the Philadelphia Annual Conference in the spring of 1816.

== Episcopal ministry ==
At the General Conference of 1816, the Rev. Robert Richford Roberts was elected to the office of bishop, 14 May 1816. Being the first married man to serve as a Methodist Bishop, and the financial support for a bishop being exceedingly small (since his predecessors had all had no dependents), Bishop Roberts settled in the western part of Pennsylvania upon a farm which he owned. From there he traveled extensively from Maine to Mississippi.

Subsequently, he removed to Indiana and settled on a farm near White River, continuing to preach, visit the churches, and attend the Conferences in all parts of the Union. He accomplished much for missions in the west (i.e., western states, which then included Indiana, etc.). Indeed, only a year or two before his death he visited the Indian mission work of his denomination west of Arkansas.

Bishop Roberts was involved in all the discussions and deliberations that culminated in the establishment of the Methodist Protestant Church. Bishop Matthew Simpson wrote of him during this time:

while during these excitements severe and exciting denunciations of the Bishops were publicly made–while they were called 'popes' and 'usurpers'–the patriarchal appearance and the humble and loving manner of Bishop Roberts disarmed prejudice wherever he went.

== Death and legacy ==
In the spring of 1843 Bishop Roberts contracted bilious fever. He died March 26, 1843, in Lawrence County, Indiana. He is buried along with his wife on the grounds of United Methodist-affiliated DePauw University, where there is also a residence hall named in his honor. The Roberts Park Methodist Episcopal Church in downtown Indianapolis is named for him, too.

== Biographies ==
- Elliott, Charles (Rev.), Life of Bishop Roberts, New York, 1853.
- Cyclopaedia of Methodism, Matthew Simpson, D.D., LL.D., Ed., (Revised Edition.) Philadelphia, Louis H. Everts, 1880.

== See also ==
- List of bishops of the United Methodist Church
