= American University speech =

1963 speech given by John F. Kennedy

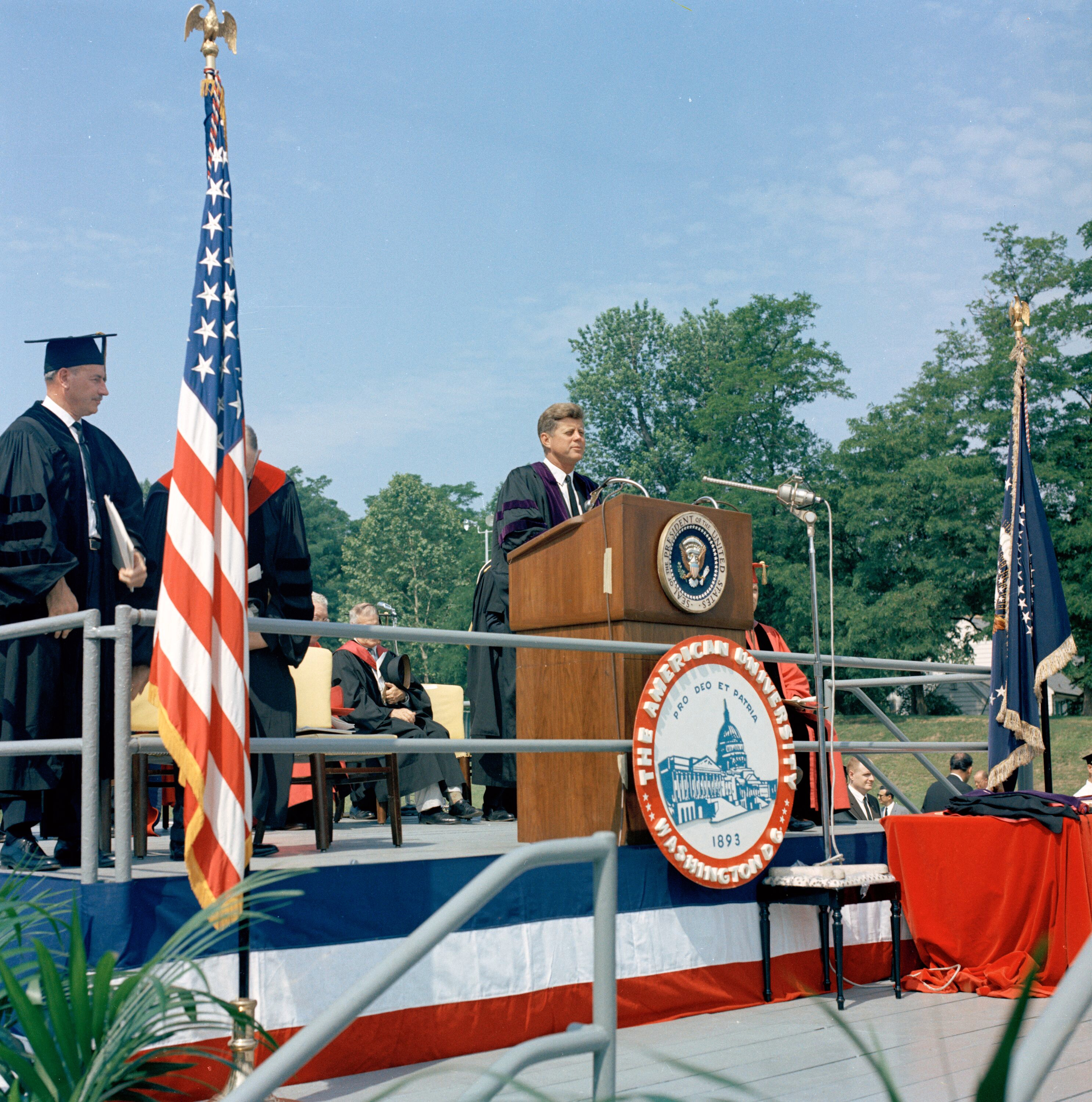
President Kennedy delivers the commencement address at American University, Monday, June 10, 1963.

World Peace Speech
Speech from American University by John F. Kennedy, June 10, 1963. Duration 26:47.

The American University speech, titled "A Strategy of Peace", was a commencement address delivered by United States President John F. Kennedy at the American University in Washington, D.C., on Monday, June 10, 1963. Widely considered one of the most powerful speeches Kennedy delivered, he not only outlined a plan to curb nuclear arms, but also "laid out a hopeful, yet realistic route for world peace at a time when the U.S. and Soviet Union faced the potential for an escalating nuclear arms race." In the speech, Kennedy announced his agreement to negotiations "toward early agreement on a comprehensive test ban treaty" (which resulted in the Nuclear Test-Ban Treaty) and also announced, for the purpose of showing "good faith and solemn convictions", his decision to unilaterally suspend all U.S. atmospheric testing of nuclear weapons as long as all other nations would do the same. Noteworthy are his comments that the United States was seeking a goal of "complete disarmament" of nuclear weapons and his vow that America "will never start a war".

The speech was unusual in its peaceful outreach to the Soviet Union at the height of the Cold War, and is remembered as one of Kennedy's finest and most important speeches.

Soviet Premier Nikita Khrushchev liked this speech so much that he ordered its full Russian translation published in Pravda and Izvestia, which was unprecedented at that time.

== Background ==
After the Cuban Missile Crisis in October 1962, Kennedy was determined to construct a better relationship with the Soviet Union to discourage another threat of nuclear war. He believed that Soviet Premier Nikita Khrushchev was also interested in renewing U.S.–Soviet relations.

On November 19, 1962, Khrushchev had submitted a report to the Central Committee of the Communist Party that implicitly called for a halt in foreign intervention to concentrate on the economy. One month later, Khrushchev wrote Kennedy a letter stating "the time has come now to put an end once and for all to nuclear tests." Kennedy greeted this response with enthusiasm and suggested that technical discussions for nuclear inspections begin between representatives of the two governments.

However, Kennedy faced opposition for any test ban from Republican leaders and his own State Department. After several months the opposition in the Senate lessened and gave the Kennedy Administration the opportunity to pursue the ban with the Soviet Union. In May 1963, the president informed his National Security Advisor McGeorge Bundy that he wished to deliver a major address on peace. According to Special Assistant Ted Sorensen the speech was kept confidential in fear that the unprecedented tone would "set off alarm bells in more bellicose quarters in Washington" and allow political attacks against Kennedy in advance of the speech.

In the days before the speech, Kennedy was committed to addressing the U.S. Conference of Mayors in Honolulu and asked Sorensen to construct the initial draft with input from several members of Kennedy's staff. The speech was reviewed and edited by Kennedy and Sorensen on the return flight from Honolulu days before the address. Historian and Special Assistant Arthur M. Schlesinger Jr. observed in his diary, "from the viewpoint of orderly administration, this was a bad way to prepare a major statement on foreign policy. But the State Department could never in a thousand years have produced this speech."

== Style ==
Sorensen had been Kennedy's aide since the 1952 Massachusetts Senatorial election, and eventually served as his primary campaign speechwriter and as Special Counsel during and after the 1960 Presidential election. By 1963 he had written drafts for nearly every speech Kennedy delivered in office, including the inaugural address, the Cuban Missile Crisis speech, and the Ich bin ein Berliner speech. Common elements of the Kennedy-Sorensen speeches were alliteration, repetition and chiasmus as well as historical references and quotations. Although Kennedy often interposed off-the-cuff ad-libs to his speeches, he did not deviate from the final draft of the address. Anca Gata described Ted Sorensen as "the chief architect of the speech in language, style, composition, and rhetoric. One of the most original issues in the speech was the reintroduction of the Russian people to the Americans as a great culture with important achievements in science and space, and as promoting economic and industrial growth on their own."

The content of the speech was unapologetically "dovish" in its pursuit of peace. Kennedy noted that almost uniquely among the "major world powers" the United States and Russia had never been at war with each other. He also acknowledged the massive human casualties that Russia suffered during World War II and declared that no nation had "ever suffered more than the Soviet Union in the Second World War," a fact that had gone largely unheralded in the West due to the onset of the Cold War. Kennedy sought to draw similarities between the United States and the Soviet Union several times and called for a "reexamination" of American attitudes towards Russia. He warned that adopting a course towards nuclear confrontation would be "evidence only of the bankruptcy of our policy—or of a collective death-wish for the world."

"For, in the final analysis, our most basic common link is that we all inhabit this small planet. We all breathe the same air. We all cherish our children's future. And we are all mortal." — John F. Kennedy

Jeffrey Sachs, American economist and director of the Earth Institute at Columbia University, was deeply moved by the speech, "not only for its eloquence and content, but also for its relevance to today's global challenges. For in it Kennedy tells us about transforming our deepest aspirations—in this case for peace—into practical realities. He almost presents a method, a dream-and-do combination that soars with high vision and yet walks on earth with practical results." In reviewing the history and context of Kennedy's speech at American University, Sachs' esteem for Kennedy grew further, concluding, "I have come to believe that Kennedy's quest for peace is not only the greatest achievement of his presidency, but also one of the greatest acts of world leadership in the modern era."

One of the American University students graduating that day was Senator Robert Byrd, who received his law degree while serving in the Senate. At the beginning of his speech. Kennedy made reference to Senator Byrd and his receiving his degree.

== Aftermath ==
=== Soviet response ===
Kennedy's speech was made available, in its entirety, in the Soviet press so that the people in the Soviet Union could read it without hindrance. Additionally, the speech could be heard in the Soviet Union without censorship because jamming measures against the Western broadcast agencies such as Voice of America did not take place upon rebroadcast of Kennedy's speech. Khrushchev was deeply moved and impressed by Kennedy's speech, telling Undersecretary of State Averell Harriman that it was "the greatest speech by any American President since Roosevelt."

After 12 days of negotiations and less than two months after the president's speech, the Partial Nuclear Test Ban Treaty was completed. The Partial Nuclear Test Ban Treaty was signed by the governments of the Soviet Union, the United Kingdom and the United States (represented by Dean Rusk), named the "Original Parties", at Moscow on August 5, 1963. US ratification occurred by the U.S. Senate on September 24, 1963, by a vote of 80–19 and the treaty was signed into law by Kennedy on October 7, 1963. The treaty went into effect on October 10, 1963.

=== Other reactions ===
The speech was met with little response in the United States; after one week, only 896 letters were sent to the White House concerning its content (in contrast to over 28,000 related to a bill affecting the price of freight). The response from Republicans in Congress was mostly dismissive in nature. Republican Senator Barry Goldwater accused Kennedy of taking a "soft stance" on the Soviet Union. The speech was met with some skepticism within the US. The speech was endorsed by Hubert Humphrey and other Democrats, but labeled a "dreadful mistake" by Goldwater and "another case of concession" by Everett Dirksen, the leader of the Senate Republicans. Dirksen and Charles A. Halleck, the second-ranking House Republican, warned that the renewed negotiations might end in "virtual surrender".

== Legacy ==
Robert McNamara, Kennedy's Secretary of Defense, declared at a 2003 memorial event at the John F. Kennedy Presidential Library and Museum that the speech was "one of the great documents of the 20th century." He later commented that it "laid out exactly what Kennedy's intentions were." Ted Sorensen considered the address Kennedy's most important speech and Kennedy's best speech.
