= New England Annual Conference =

The New England Annual Conference is an Annual Conference (a regional episcopal area, similar to a diocese) of the United Methodist Church. This conference serves the congregations in Maine, New Hampshire, Massachusetts, Rhode Island, eastern Connecticut, and all of Vermont. The conference's administrative offices and the office of the bishop are located in Lawrence, Massachusetts. It is part of the Northeastern Jurisdictional Conference. The bishop is the Reverend Sudarshana Devadhar (Boston Area).

== "HISTORY:" ==
(SOURCE- The Wesley Center) Asbury traversed New England each of these years down to the last before that of his death. He always approached it with peculiar feelings; with mingled repugnance and hopefulness. He seemed there as in a foreign land, while all the rest of the nation was his familiar domain. Everywhere else he was welcomed by enthusiastic throngs; there he was repelled, and pursued his solitary journeys comparatively a stranger, finding refuge in families which were proscribed as heretical by public opinion, and in "meetings" which were impeached as fanatical "conventicles." Yet he believed that Methodism would "radiate" over these elder communities. "I feel," he writes, "as if God will work in these states and give us a great harvest; a glorious work of God will be wrought here. Surely we shall rise in New England in the next generation." He lived to see the verification of his prediction. To him the religious life of New England presented an example of the rigid Hebrew legalism, strangely combined with the speculative dogmatism of the early Greek Church but unrelieved by the spiritual mysticism of the latter, and nearly destitute of the vital charity and joyousness primitive faith.

Its distinctive theology he detested; it seemed to him to bind, as in iron bands, the souls of the people; depressing, by its tenets of election and reprobation with uncomplaining but profound distress, scrupulous, timid, and therefore often the best consciences; inflating the confidence and Pharisaism of the self-reliant or self-conceited, who assumed their predestination to heaven; enforcing the morality without the gracious consolation of religion; and giving to the recklessly immoral an apology for their lives in their very demoralization, their lack of "effectual grace," of "an effectual call." Devout Augustinian theologians would not indeed admit his logic; such was nevertheless his honest estimate of the New England Church, and he continually returned to the East, directing the best energies of Methodism against its traditional beliefs and ecclesiastical stagnancy.

There, more than anywhere else, we have to regret the scantiness of his journals, for there, in his hardest field, his reflections as well as his facts would be most interesting to us. He re-entered it in the spring of 1804, and on the fourteenth of July opened the New England Conference at Buxton, Me. The ordination was held in a wood, where the bishop preached from a heavy heart. He describes the occasion as "an open time." "The work of God broke forth," he says, "on the right and on the left." A great sensation spread among the multitude, and before the session closed it was estimated that fifty persons were converted. Snelling says, "There was a greater display of divine power at this Conference than any I ever attended. Many of the people were wrought upon in a very powerful manner; but, as is generally the case, there was some opposition. At one meeting a man, appearing to be in a violent passion, came in, and called for his wife, bidding her leave immediately. She urged him to stay a little longer. 'No,' said he; 'let us go.' He then started to go, but paused a few moments, then turned back, fell upon his knees, and prayed for mercy as earnestly as any. The preachers were placed in different directions in the grove, praying and exhorting. The people would gather around them in companies, similar to what are called praying circles at camp-meetings. In the circle which I was in there were eleven persons who professed to be brought from darkness to light, besides many others who were inquiring what they must do to be saved." [1] "It was," wrote Joshua Taylor, "the greatest time that we have seem in New England."

The New England Annual Conference maintains four campground/retreat centers:

- Camp Aldersgate, North Scituate, Rhode Island
- Camp Mechuwana, Winthrop, Maine
- Rolling Ridge Conference and Retreat Center, North Andover, Massachusetts
- Wanakee United Methodist Center, Meredith, New Hampshire

== Districts ==
The New England Annual Conference is further subdivided into 8 smaller regions, called "districts," which provide further administrative functions for the operation of local churches in cooperation with each other. This structure is vital to Methodism, and is referred to as connectionalism. The districts that comprise the New England Annual Conference are:

=== District 1 - Northern Maine ===
District Superintendent the Rev. Jackie Brannen

=== District 2 - Mid-Maine ===
District Superintendent the Rev. Karen Munson

=== District 3 - New Hampshire ===
District Superintendent the Rev. Gwen Puroshotham, interim

=== District 6 - Central Massachusetts ===
District Superintendent the Rev. Rene A. Perez

=== District 8 - Rhode Island/Southeastern Mass ===
District Superintendent - Rev. Dr. Andrew Foster III

- Southeastern Massachusetts
  - Acushnet Wesley United Methodist Church, Acushnet
  - Long Plain United Methodist Church, Acushnet, MA
  - Myricks United Methodist Church, Berkley
  - Bourne United Methodist Church, Bourne
  - Northside United Methodist Church, Brewster
  - Bridgewater United Methodist Church, Bridgewater
  - Bryantville United Methodist Church, Bryantville
  - Carver United Parish, Carver
  - Cataumet United Methodist Church, Cataumet
  - First United Methodist Church, Chatham
  - Chilmark Community Church, Chilmark
  - Cotuit Federated Church, Cotuit
  - Cuttyhunk Union Methodist Church, Cuttyhunk Island
  - High Street United Methodist Church, Duxbury
  - East Bridgewater United Methodist Church, East Bridgewater
  - Eastham United Methodist Church, Eastham
  - Harwich United Methodist Church, East Harwich
  - Haven United Methodist Church, East Providence, RI
  - Edgartown United Methodist Church, Edgartown
  - Union United Methodist Church, Fall River
  - John Wesley United Methodist Church, Falmouth
  - Faith Fellowship United Methodist Church, Mansfield
  - Central United Methodist Church, Middleborough
  - South Middleborough United Methodist Church, Middleborough
  - Nantucket United Methodist Church, Nantucket
  - Centre Trinity UMC, New Bedford
  - Saint Paul's United Methodist Church, New Bedford
  - Chartley Norton United Methodist Church, Norton
  - Trinity United Methodist Church, Oak Bluffs
  - Saint Mark's United Methodist Church, Onset
  - Orleans United Methodist Church, Orleans
  - Osterville United Methodist Church, Osterville
  - Plymouth United Methodist Church, Plymouth
  - Provincetown United Methodist Church, Provincetown
  - Swift Memorial United Methodist Church, Sagamore Beach
  - Somerset United Methodist Church, Somerset
  - South Yarmouth United Methodist Church, South Yarmouth
  - Memorial United Methodist Church, Taunton
  - Trinity United Methodist Church, Taunton
  - Christ United Methodist Church, Vineyard Haven
  - Wesley United Methodist Church, Wareham
  - Wellfleet United Methodist Church, Wellfleet
  - Cochesett United Methodist Church, West Bridgewater
  - West Falmouth United Methodist Church, West Falmouth
  - Westport Point United Methodist Church, Westport Point
- Rhode Island
  - Barrington United Methodist Church, Barrington
  - Arnold Mills United Methodist Church, Cumberland
  - Cornerstone of Faith United Methodist Church, Coventry
  - Greene United Methodist Church, Coventry
  - East Greenwich United Methodist Church, East Greenwich
  - Shepherd of the Valley United Methodist Church, Hope
  - Christ United Methodist Church, Kingston
  - Wesley United Methodist Church, Lincoln
  - Calvary United Methodist Church, Middletown
  - Saint Paul's United Methodist Church, Newport
  - North Kingstown United Methodist Church, North Kingstown
  - Epworth United Methodist Church, Pawtucket
  - Portsmouth United Methodist Church, Portsmouth
  - Mathewson Street United Methodist Church, Providence
  - Trinity United Methodist Church, Providence
  - Vida Abundante United Methodist Church, Providence
  - First United Methodist Church of Warren/Bristol, Warren
  - Asbury United Methodist Church, Warwick
  - Open Table of Christ United Methodist Church, Warwick and Providence
  - Zion Korean United Methodist Church, Warwick
  - Grace United Methodist Church, Westerly
  - The River United Methodist Communities of Faith, Woonsocket

== See also ==
- Annual Conferences of the United Methodist Church
