= Jan Jacob van Oosterzee =

Dutch theologian (1817–1882)

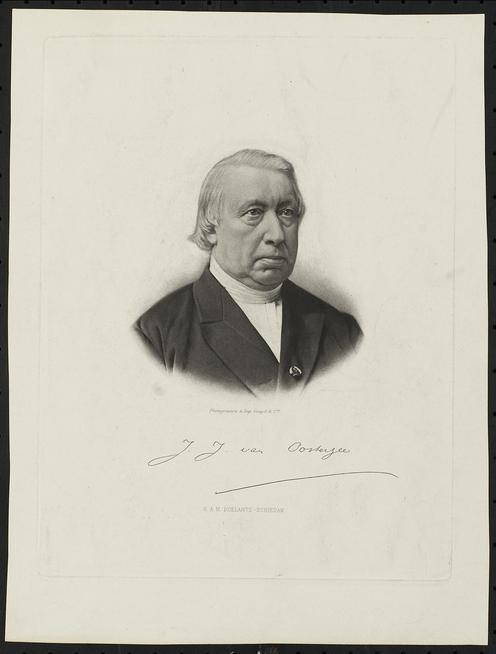
- Born: 1 April 1817; Rotterdam, Netherlands
- Died: 29 July 1882 (aged 65)
- Education: University of Utrecht
- Occupations: Pastor; Professor of Theology
- Known for: Collected sermons

Jan Jacob van Oosterzee (1 April 1817 – 29 July 1882), Dutch divine, was born at Rotterdam. He was educated at the University of Utrecht 1835–1839. He was also known as Jan Jakob van Oosterzee, JJ van Oosterzee, or Johannes Jacobus van Oosterzee.

After acting as pastor at Eemnes-Binnen 1841–43, Alkmaar 1843–44 and Rotterdam 1844–62, in 1863 he was made professor of biblical and practical theology at the University of Utrecht, with which he was variously connected until the end of his life. Oosterzee earned a reputation as a preacher, was editor of the Theolog. Jahrbücher from 1845, wrote a number of noteworthy books on religious history, and published poems in Dutch (1882).

== Career ==
Of his sermons, some 270 were printed in more than twelve volumes 1846–70, including Mozes (Rotterdam, 1859; English translation, Moses: a Biblical Study, Edinburgh, 1876). He likewise published De Heidelbergsche Catechismus in fifty-two lectures (1869), and issued many individual sermons which were widely circulated. In these sermons Van Oosterzee laid his entire stress (in somewhat rhetorical fashion) on the preaching of the Gospel, the proclamation of Christ according to the Scriptures, and the announcing of salvation; but regarded the pulpit least of all the place from which to transcend the Gospel into the regions of dogmatic speculation. His avowed aim as a preacher was rather to edify than instruct. Holding himself aloof from the radical, naturalistic, and purely ethical tendencies, remaining neutral toward negative criticism, and in Christology maintaining a distinctly supernaturalistic position, he was pleased to call himself "Evangelical, or Christian Orthodox."

With all his activity as a preacher, Van Oosterzee devoted himself zealously to theological science. This phase of his activity he began with the first article, Verhandeling over den tegenwoordigen toestand der Apologetiek, in the newly founded Jaarboeken voor wetenschappelijke theologie, followed the next year by his treatise "On the Value of the Acts of the Apostles" (1846). To this same period belongs his Christologie (Rotterdam, 1855–61; English translation, The Image of Christ as Presented in Scripture, London, 1874) and by his commentaries on Luke (Bielefeld and Leipsic, 1859), the pastoral epistles and Philemon (1861), and James (in collaboration with J. P. Lange, 1862) for J. P. Lange's Bibelwerk.

After his professorial appointment at Utrecht in 1863, Van Oosterzee wrote his brief Theologie des Nieuwen Verbonds (Utrecht, 1867; Eng. transl., Theology of the New Testament, New York, 1893), which was followed by the larger Christelijke dogmatiek (2 parts, 1870–72; English translation, Christian Dogmatics, 2 vols., New York, 1876). The best of his academic works, however, was his Praktische theologie (2 parts, Utrecht, 1877–78; English transl., New York, 1879), in which he considered homiletics, liturgics, catechetics, pastoral theology, missions, and even apologetics.

In 1877, with the passage of the law forbidding the theological faculty to lecture on Biblical, dogmatic, and practical theology, Van Oosterzee was compelled, against his will, to teach the philosophy of religion, New Testament introduction, and the history of Christian dogma, in which he gave instruction until his death. His memoirs appeared posthumously under the title Uit Mijn Levensboek, voor, mijne Vrienden (Utrecht, 1883), and collections of his minor writings were published later in two groups comprising: Redevoeringen, verhandelingen en verspreide geschriften (Rotterdam, 1857); Varia. Verspreide geschriften (1861); Christelijk-litterairische opstellen (Amsterdam, 1877); Christelijk-historische opstellen (1879). Mention should also be made of his popular devotional book, Het jaar des heils: Levenswoorden voor iederen dag (1874; English transl., Year of salvation: Words of Life for every Day, New York, 1875), and of the posthumous collection of his poems entitled Uit de dichterlijke nalatenshap (Amsterdam, 1884).

A collected edition of Oosterzee's works was published in French, Œuvres complètes, in three volumes (1877-1880). His autobiography appeared in 1882. His book Practical Theology was one of two "most influential" works on that topic in the United States. His theological position is described as premillennial and mild chiliast.

== Selected works ==
- Oosterzee, Jan Jacob Van (2010). Christian Dogmatics. Translated by J.W. Watson and M.J. Evans. Nabu Press. p. 852. ISBN 978-1149809631.
- Oosterzee, Jan Jacob Van (2010). The Theology of the New Testament. Translated by M. J. Evans. Nabu Press. p. 468. ISBN 978-1147080834.
