= Calvin Kingsley =

American bishop (1812–1870)

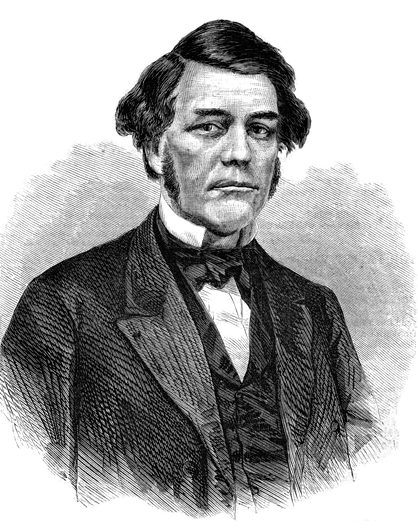
- Kingsley in Harper's Weekly, April 30, 1870
- Born: September 8, 1812; Annsville, New York, U.S.
- Died: April 6, 1870 (aged 57); Beirut, Syria

Calvin Kingsley (8 September 1812 – 6 April 1870) was an American bishop of the Methodist Episcopal Church elected in 1864.

== Birth and family ==
Kingsley was born in Annsville, Oneida County, New York, US, the first child and eldest son of Oren (Jr.) and Margaret (Buchanan) Kingsley. His family were of early Connecticut history. Calvin's parents were not members of any church. He was converted at the age of 18 in the Methodist Church of Ellington, New York. His parents later were converted because of his witness, ultimately sending two sons into the ministry (including Calvin's brother Alanson Kingsley, who is a great-great-great grandfather of singer-songwriter, Taylor Swift).

In 1841 Calvin married Delia Deborah Scudder, the daughter of Captain Marvin and Deborah (Boughton) Scudder. They had five children: Frank, Eliza, Mary, Ellen and Martha.

== Education ==
Kingsley attended Allegheny College, Meadville, Pennsylvania (1836–41), working as a janitor to pay his expenses, calling himself the "Professor of dust and ashes." He was Licensed to Preach in 1838 and admitted on Trial by the Erie Annual Conference of the M.E. Church in 1841.

== Ordained and academic ministry ==
Rev. Kingsley was appointed to Saegertown, Crawford County, Pennsylvania (1841–42), and Meadville, Pennsylvania (1842–43). He was ordained a deacon in the M.E. Church and admitted into Full Connection in 1843.

He was a Professor of Mathematics at Allegheny College (1841–44). He was then appointed pastor at Erie, Pennsylvania (1844–46). In 1844 Rev. Kingsley successfully debated someone of the Universalist faith. He was ordained an elder in the M.E. Church in 1845. He returned to teaching mathematics at Allegheny (1846–55), becoming vice president of the college in 1855.

Rev. Kingsley's final assignment before election to the episcopacy was as editor of the Western Christian Advocate (1856–64), an important periodical of his denomination. During this time he resided at Columbus, Franklin County, Ohio.

== Episcopal ministry ==
In 1860 the General Conference recognised him as the leader of the antislavery movement, and he later became the chairman of the Slavery Committee.

Rev. Kingsley was elected a bishop at the 1864 General Conference of the M.E. Church. He was elected the same year as Bishops Clark and Thomson, all three of whom died in their first quadrennium of episcopal leadership.

Between 1869 and 1870, Kingsley embarked on a trip around the world in the cause of missionary work. While abroad, Bishop Kingsley wrote home, describing Japan, Shaghi, Pekin, Foo Chow, Calcutta, Singapore, Madras, Benares, Lucknow, and Bareilly. After a detour to the Holy Land, he planned to visit Methodist missions in Bulgaria, Norway, Sweden, and Denmark, and to attend conferences in Switzerland, Ireland and England. The group with whom he visited the Holy Land included Frances Willard.

== Death and burial ==
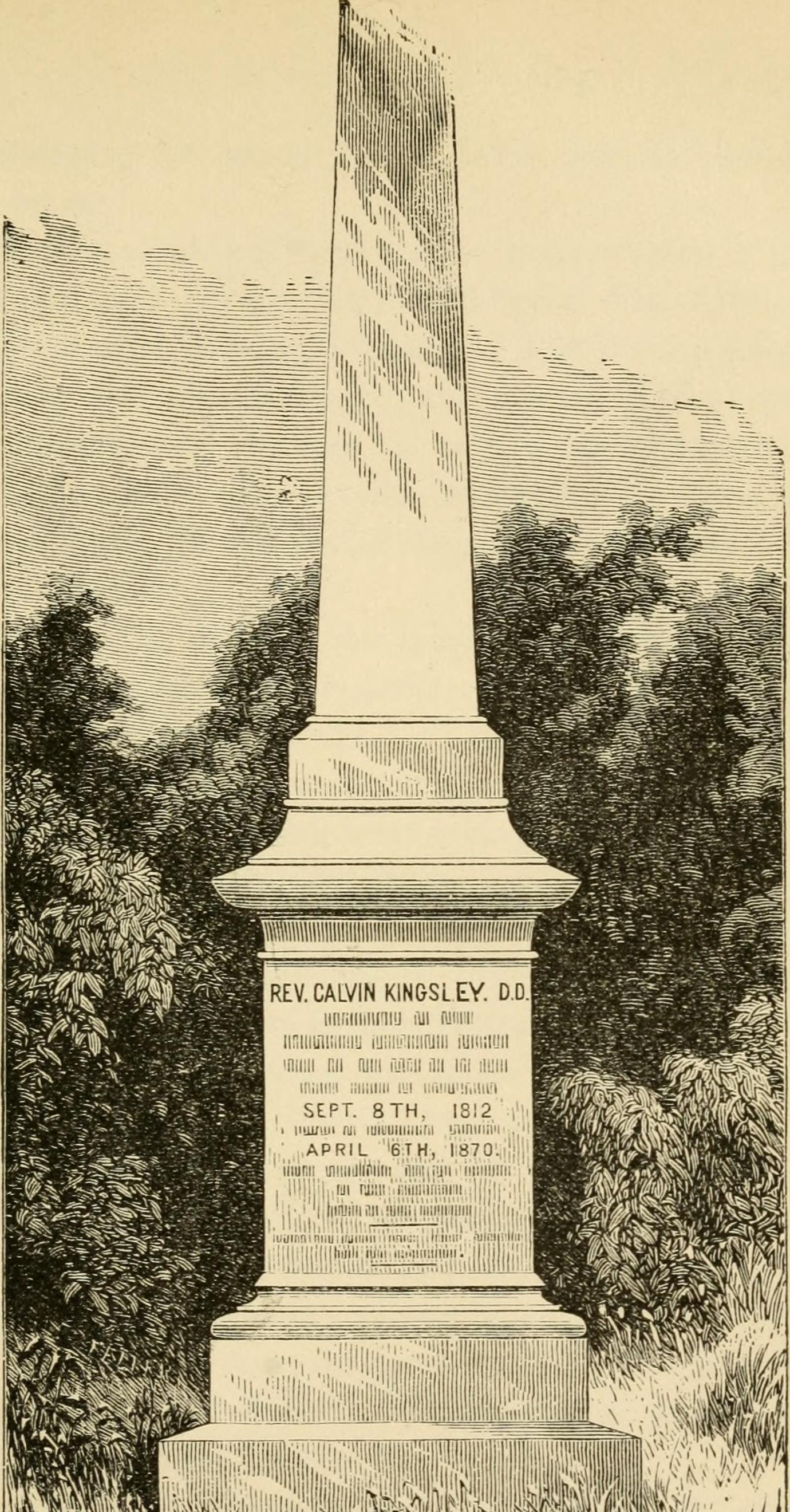
Bishop Kingsley's Monument

Bishop Kingsley's trip, and his life, were cut short, however. He was stricken by a heart attack while visiting the Holy Land, and died on 6 April 1870 in Beirut, Syria (now Lebanon), at the age of fifty-seven expiring in
the arms of Rev. Henry Bannister, D. D., whom he had providentially met at Jerusalem, and who became his companion to Beirut. He was buried in Beirut in the Prussian Protestant Cemetery, where the Methodist Church erected a monument in his memory.

== Selected writings ==
- The Resurrection of the Dead, a vindication of the literal resurrection of the human body; in opposition to the work of Professor Bush, 1847.
- Sermon in Original Sermons of Pittsburgh, Erie and W. Va. Conferences, William Hunter, Editor, 1850.
- Round the World, Letters and Observations on Europe and the East, published posthumously, 1870.

== Biography ==
- Hunter, William, a sketch in Lives of Methodist Bishops, Flood and Hamilton, 1882.

== See also ==
- List of bishops of the United Methodist Church

== Sources ==
- Leete, Frederick DeLand (1948). Methodist Bishops. Nashville: The Methodist Publishing House.
- "Calvin Kingsley" in The Twentieth Century Biographical Dictionary of Notable Americans, Volume VI.
