= Matthew Simpson =

American Methodist bishop and academic (1811–1884)

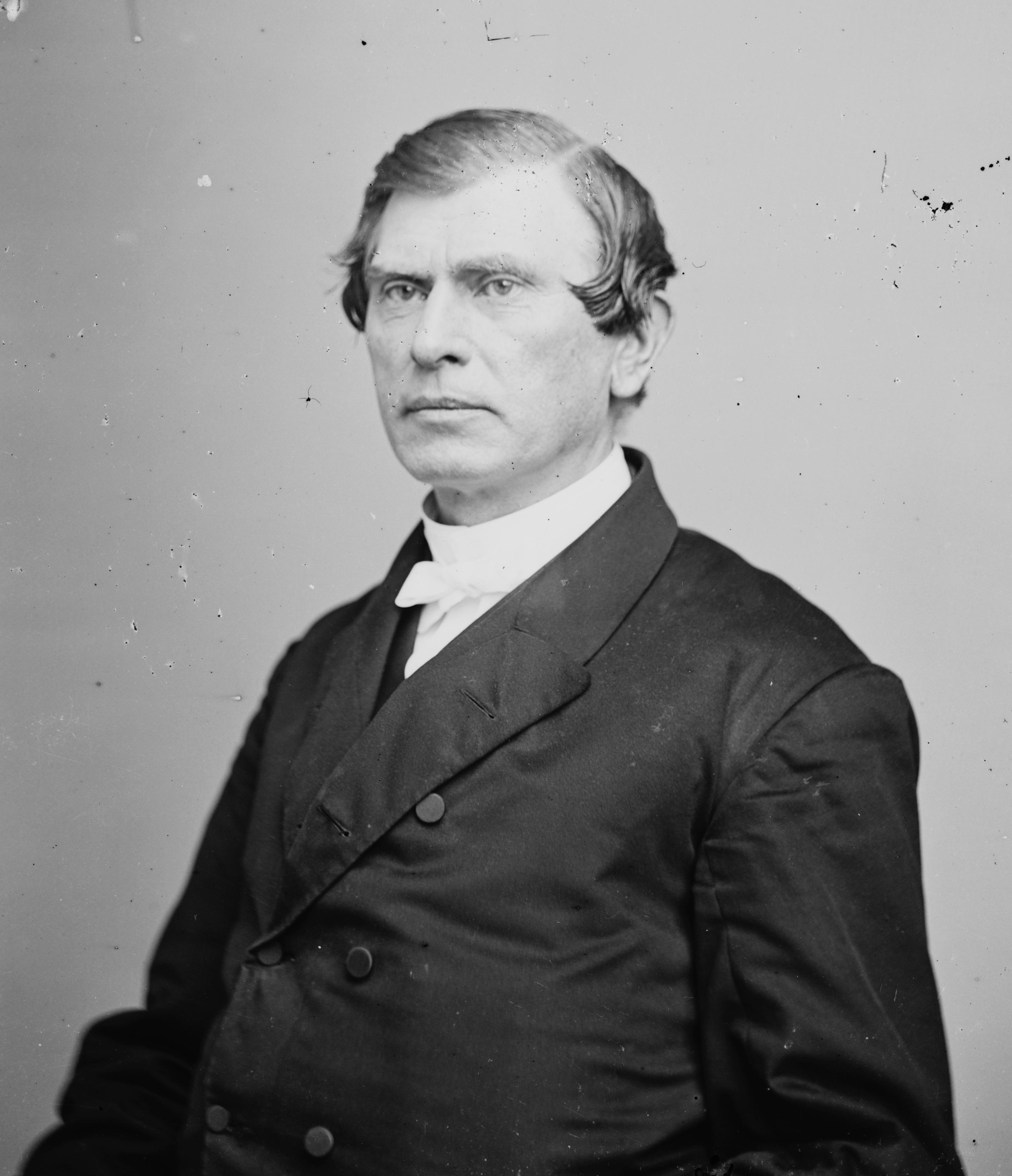
- Simpson, 1855–1865
- Born: June 21, 1811; Cadiz, Ohio
- Died: June 18, 1884 (aged 72); Philadelphia, Pennsylvania
- Occupation: Pastor

Matthew Simpson (June 21, 1811 – June 18, 1884) was an American bishop of the Methodist Episcopal Church, elected in 1852 and based mainly in Philadelphia. During the Reconstruction Era after the Civil War, most evangelical denominations in the North, especially the Methodists, were initially strong supporters of radical policies that favored the Freedmen (former slaves) and distrusted the Southern whites. However, by the late 1860s in border state conferences, the MEC North moved well away from their work with the Freedmen's Bureau and often sided with the grievances of Southern white members. Bishop Simpson played a leading role in mobilizing the Northern Methodists for the cause. His biographer calls him the "High Priest of the Radical Republicans."

== Early life and family ==
Matthew was born in Cadiz, Ohio. His grandfather, Thomas Simpson, was a British soldier who emigrated to Ireland. Matthew's father came to America in 1793. Matthew's grandfather Tingley was a Revolutionary soldier. Matthew's uncle also was Matthew Simpson, who also emigrated from Ireland to America in 1793. This Matthew Simpson represented Harrison County, Ohio, in the Ohio State Senate for ten years, and served as judge of the county court for seven years. In later life, he lived with his nephew, reaching the advanced age of ninety-eight. Matthew, the nephew, married Ellen H. Verner of Pittsburgh.

Matthew was consecrated at birth for the ministry by both of his parents. He was baptized as an infant by Bishop Francis Asbury. He was converted to Christ in 1829. Matthew received an academic education in his hometown. He then attended Madison College in Pennsylvania. Madison subsequently merged into Allegheny College in 1833. Matthew was elected to the office of Tutor in his eighteenth year, then engaging in teaching. Having also studied medicine in 1830–1833, he began medical practice.

== Ministry ==
Shortly thereafter, feeling it his duty to enter the ministry, Matthew was licensed to preach in the M.E. Church, and was received on-trial in the Pittsburgh Annual Conference in 1833. He was ordained by Bishop Robert Richford Roberts. Matthew was appointed pastor of the Liberty Street Methodist Church in Pittsburgh in 1835, and of a church at Monongahela, Pennsylvania, in 1836. He was ordained elder in 1837.

The Rev. Simpson was appointed Professor of Natural Science and elected vice-president of Allegheny College, Meadville, Pennsylvania. In 1838 he was elected professor, and in 1839 president of the newly established Indiana Asbury University (now DePauw University) in Greencastle, Indiana, remaining until 1848. The Rev. Simpson was then elected editor of the Western Christian Advocate, which he made a strong temperance and anti-slavery organ, from 1848 to 1852.

The Rev. Dr. Matthew Simpson was elected to the episcopacy of his denomination by the M.E. General Conference, May 1852. In discharging his duties, Bishop Simpson visited and presided over conferences in all of the states encompassing the M.E. Church as well as most of the related U.S. Territories. He was sent by the General Conference as a delegate to the Irish and British Wesleyan (i.e., Methodist) Conferences in 1857, as well as to the Evangelical Alliance in Berlin the same year. He traveled with John McClintock. From Berlin, Bishop Simpson extended his travels through Turkey, the Holy Land, Egypt, and Greece, returning to the United States in 1858.

In 1859, Bishop Simpson changed his residence from Pittsburgh to Evanston, Illinois, where he accepted the position of president of the Garrett Biblical Institute (now, Garrett–Evangelical Theological Seminary). In 1868 he became a Trustee of Drew Theological Seminary (today Drew University), the new Methodist seminary in Madison, NJ, and served as president of its board from 1877 to 1880.

== American Civil War ==
Before the Civil War, debates over slavery were highly contentious among Northern Methodists, but Simpson did not take sides, playing instead a moderate and cautious role. With the outbreak of the Civil War in April 1861, he became a staunch champion of the Union and helped his denomination take a leading role in providing chaplains, volunteers and civilian support for the war effort.

Simpson became a trusted friend of President Abraham Lincoln, who considered his advice of great value. He attended the family at Lincoln's death and gave the sermon at his funeral in Springfield. During the War, Bishop Simpson delivered a number of speeches in behalf of the Union. He was urged by the Secretary of War to undertake the organization of the freedmen at the establishment of the Freedman's Bureau. After the war, Bishop Simpson was invited by President Grant to go as a commissioner to San Domingo but he declined both offers.

On March 7, 1866, Simpson was elected as 3rd Class (honorary) Companion of the Military Order of the Loyal Legion of the United States in recognition of his support for the Union during the Civil War.

== More foreign travel ==
In 1870, at the death of Bishop Kingsley, Bishop Simpson again visited Europe to complete the work which had been assigned to him on the continent. He also went as a delegate again to the English Wesleyan Conference. In 1874, Bishop Simpson visited Mexico. He returned to Europe in 1875, presiding over the Annual Conference of Germany and Switzerland. He also met with the M.E. missionaries in different parts of Europe. He then addressed the Garfield Memorial Meeting at Exeter Hall, London, on September 24, 1881. Bishop Simpson was also a gifted orator and throughout the war he gave his much forgotten "Great War Speech" which was so powerful and stirring it could move entire audiences to tears and cheering pride. He delivered this speech over 60 times throughout the war, and it easily motivated and inspired cities wary of the long war.

== Death and burial ==
Bishop Matthew Simpson was taken ill at San Francisco in 1880, but recovered to preach the opening sermon at the First Ecumenical Methodist Conference in London (1881). He was present at the M.E. General Conference in 1884, but took little part. He died June 18, 1884, in Philadelphia and was buried in West Laurel Hill Cemetery, Bala Cynwyd, Pennsylvania.

== Selected writings ==
- Sermon: Influence on the Human Mind of the Manifestation of God's Glory - The Methodist Pulpit, in Clark, D.W., Sermons for the College, Akers, 1851.
- Sermon in Sermons for the Home Circle, T.P. Akers, Ed., 1859.
- A Hundred Years of Methodism, 1876.
- Lectures on Preaching (1879), delivered before the Theological Department of Yale College.
- A volume of his Sermons (1885) was edited by George R. Crooks.
- Cyclopedia of Methodism, 1858 (and subsequent editions).

== Biographies ==
- Carwardine, Richard. "Methodists, politics, and the coming of the American Civil War". Church history 69.03 (2000): 578–609.
- Clark, Robert D. The Life of Matthew Simpson (1956)
- Stowell, Daniel W. "Simpson, Matthew"; American National Biography Online February 2000. Access July 24, 2014

== See also ==
- List of bishops of the United Methodist Church
- Simpson College

== Biographical sources ==
- Cyclopaedia of Methodism, Matthew Simpson, D.D., LL.D., Ed., (Revised Edition) Philadelphia, Louis H. Everts, 1880.
- Leete, Frederick DeLand, Methodist Bishops. Nashville, The Methodist Publishing House, 1948.

Preceded by Thomas Asbury Morris	Ohio United Methodist Bishops; 1852	Succeeded by Edward Raymond Ames
