= Thomas Asbury Morris =

American Methodist Episcopal bishop (1794–1874)

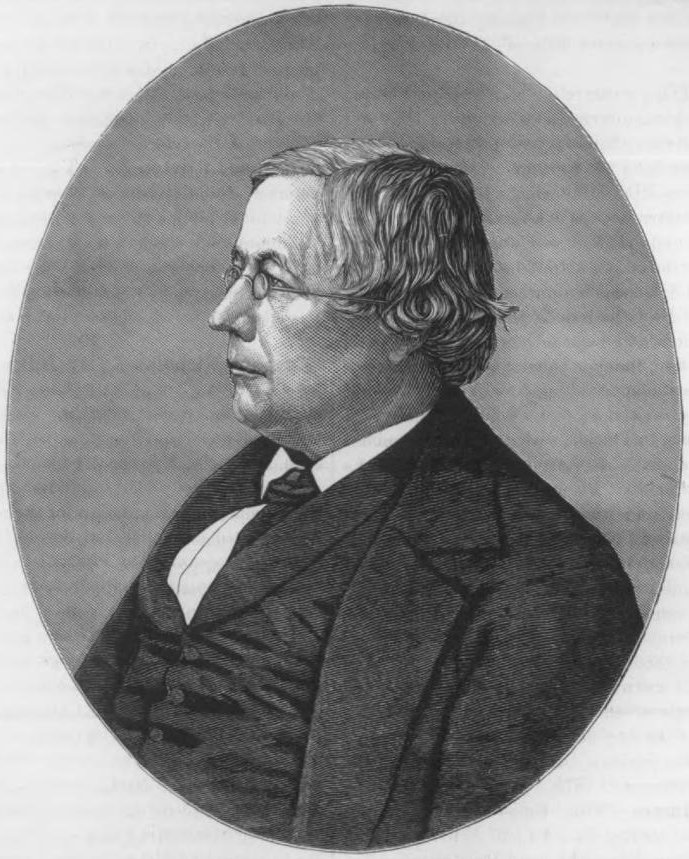
- Born: April 28, 1794; Kanawha County, Virginia
- Died: September 2, 1874 (aged 80); Springfield, Ohio
- Occupation: Clergyman

Thomas Asbury Morris (April 28, 1794 – September 2, 1874) was an American bishop of the Methodist Episcopal Church, elected in 1836. He also distinguished himself as a Methodist circuit rider, pastor, and presiding elder, and as an editor.

== Early life and family ==
Thomas was born near Charleston (then in Virginia, now in West Virginia) on April 28, 1794. He was the son of Revolutionary War Captain John Morris and mother Margaret Morris, who settled on the Kanawha River in 1774 from Culpeper, Virginia.

Thomas' early education was obtained in the common schools, later pursuing special studies in a school taught by a William Paine, an Englishman. Before reaching manhood Thomas served three years as an assistant in the office of his brother Edmund, who was County Clerk. At the age of eighteen, Thomas was drafted to serve a six-month term in the War of 1812. Owing to his youth, however, his family obtained a substitute for him, thereby allowing him to avoid military service (as was common in that day).

== Conversion and ministry ==
For some years Morris was a religious skeptic. His parents were of the Baptist faith. But in 1813, when Thomas was converted to the Christian faith, he united with the Methodist Episcopal (M.E.) Church. Thomas was licensed to preach 2 April 1814 and was ordained circa 1820 by Methodist Bishop Robert Richford Roberts. After serving as a Supply Pastor on a Methodist circuit, the Rev. Morris was admitted into the newly formed Ohio Annual Conference of the M.E. Church, September 1816.

Over the next two years, the Rev. Thomas Asbury Morris traveled ca. 5,500 miles on horseback, preaching some 500 times. During the first twelve years of his ministry he received a mere $2,000 in wages. As a preacher he was concise, clear, instructive, and even sometimes eloquent. His health suffered from his hard labor and exposure in early ministry. In 1820 he was placed in a supernumerary relation, but was sent to Lancaster, Ohio (at that time, a newly constituted station).

Subsequently, Rev. Morris was transferred to the Kentucky Annual Conference. In 1824 he was first elected a delegate to General Conference. He would be elected to every General Conference thereafter until his election to the episcopacy. In 1826 he was appointed presiding elder of the Green River District. That year he also suffered from a shock of paralysis, and was afterwards transferred back to the Ohio Conference. In spite of impaired health, however, he remained a dedicated student and a wide reader. After having been stationed in Cincinnati for several years, he was, in 1833, appointed presiding elder of the Cincinnati District. In April 1834 he was appointed editor of the Western Christian Advocate, an important periodical of his denomination, headquartered in Cincinnati, Ohio. As early as 1835 he was known to be an advocate of total abstinence (from alcoholic beverage).

The Rev. Thomas Asbury Morris was elected to the episcopacy of the M.E. Church by the 1836 General Conference. He was diligent and faithful in the discharge of all his duties, traveling extensively through the circuit of the Annual Conferences, which then embraced the whole of the settled part of the U.S.A. In 1844, when the church divided North and South over the issue of slavery, Bishop Morris remained in the Methodist Episcopal Church (the northern branch), notwithstanding that Virginia was his native State. Needless to say, he regretted the separation deeply. The division was healed in 1939 when the M.E. Church, the M.E. Church, South, and the M.P. Church reunited to form the Methodist Church. In 1968 the Methodist Church merged with the Evangelical United Brethren Church to form the United Methodist Church. For sixteen years of his thirty-six total years in the Episcopacy, Bishop Morris was Senior Bishop of his denomination (following the death of Bishop Waugh in 1858). He was practical, witty, and blunt, but kind. His spirit was said to be indomitable, and he possessed charming simplicity, both of taste and manner.

McKendree University gave him the (honorary) degree of D.D. in 1841.

== Later years and death ==
For several years Bishop Morris was in impaired health, able to do but little official work. Consequently, the General Conference voted to relieve him from any regular duties. His last illness lasted a little over a week. He died at his home in Springfield, Ohio on September 2, 1874.

== See also ==
- List of bishops of the United Methodist Church

Preceded by none	Ohio United Methodist Bishops; 1836	Succeeded by Joseph Long
