= Ruben Slaughter =

Reuben Slaughter Sr. (1733 - 1805) was an American soldier, and surveyor originally from Culpeper County, Virginia, who owned the disputed Burning Spring tract of land claimed by George Washington. Reuben, was the son of Colonel Francis Slaughter and Anne Lightfoot (daughter of Colonel Goodrich Lightfoot) from Orange County, Virginia.

== Life ==
Ruben (Reuben) Slaughter served as a captain in the Culpeper County, Va., militia early in the Revolutionary War before moving to Bedford County sometime after 1777. In 1789 he was a sergeant in Captain John Morris's Morris' Company of Rangers where he was stationed on the Great Kanawha in Greenbrier County, Virginia alongside County Lt. Colonel William Clendenin.

When Kanawha County was established in 1789, Reuben was appointed county surveyor, and on December 19, 1794, the State of Virginia established Charleston as the seat of Kanawha County. Reuben alongside Andrew Donnally Sr., William Clendenin, John Morris, Leonard Morris, George Alderson, Abraham Baker, John Young and William Morris were appointed as the trustees. He deposed in 1794 that he had enlisted in the spring of 1792 as a soldier in Capt. Hugh Caperton's company of volunteer militia formed to protect the frontier settlements from Indian attacks.

== Burning Spring Tract ==
On February 1, 1784, George Washington sent a letter to General Andrew Lewis's son, Samuel Lewis, a surveyor, requesting to know why another survey was completed in November 1774. Washington asserted that under Royal Proclamation of 1763 he is the rightful owner of a 5000-acre tract after receiving it from the Lord Governor Robert Dinwiddie. The survey in question executed on the 6th of November 1774 includes a 2950 tract of the Burning Spring that was in Washington's original 5000 acres which was adjoining the Great Kanawha to (what is commonly called) the Pokitellico Survey. Washington implored Lewis, "I have now to beg the favor of you Sir, to give me such further information respecting the application of my warrants which have come into your office, as it may be in your power to do; & to inform me at the same time whether the Survey of 2950, acres made for my benefit, has ever been returned to the Secretarys office: Also, whether a patent for the Tract including the burning Spring has ever been obtained—for what quantity of acres—what improvements are on it, with such other particulars as may be interesting for me to know—particularly, in what County it lies—how far it is from the Kanhawa in the nearest part—& from the mouth of Cole river, where it forms its junction with the latter."

On February 25, 1792, President George Washington personally sent Reuben a letter in response to Rueben's November 21, 1791 letter stating he had received a 200-acre tract of land that fell within the ownership of Washington prior to the American Revolution that was given to Washington by Virginia-interim Governor William Nelson. Washington's claimed ownership of a large tract of land in the Kanawha and Greenbrier that he claimed he surveyed in 1770 and still retained ownership thereof. Washington concluded his letter with, "I therefore desire you will consider this letter as a solemn warning, not to make any Settlement, or exercise any other right of proprietorship on any part of the land within the lines of my patent: assuring you that if you should, after this warning persevere in your intention of settling or otherwise encroaching upon my land, you must expect to be prosecuted as far as right and justice will admit.3 I am Sir your very humble Servant, Go: Washington."

Shortly after Washington's death, Washington's heirs went Court attempting to retrieve the land in question but ultimately failed when Leonard Morris was produced as a witness for the plaintiff, after being first duly sworn, deposed and said, "That in the year 1775, this deponent was residing on Kanawha river about six miles from Burning Spring Tract. During that year, Messrs. Samuel Lewis, a surveyor, Colonel John Stuart, of Greenbrier, and Thomas Bullitt were on the Kanawha surveying lands, and procured from out of this deponent's family, Mungo Price and his son as chain carriers; that after the party returned from surveying, this deponent understood from them that they had surveyed the Burning Spring Tract for the late General George Washington and Andrew Lewis. This deponent, with the exception of some periods when the Indian wars made it hazardous to keep a family on Kanawha, has made it his principal residence since 1775. Sometimes during the Indian troubles, this deponent's family resided altogether in Greenbrier."
