= Achilles Morris =

American politician (1800–1847)

Member of the Illinois House of Representatives from Sangamon County
- In office December 1, 1832 – December 6, 1834
- Succeeded by: Abraham Lincoln

Personal details
- Born: May 8, 1800 Kanawha County, West Virginia
- Died: February 15, 1847 (aged 46) Tampico, Mexico
- Party: Democratic-Republican
- Spouse: Leah Jarrett (m.1822)
- Children: 11, including Jonathan Morris
- Known for: Abraham Lincoln's commanding officer during the Black Hawk War; defeating Lincoln in the Sangamon County election of 1832

Military service
- Allegiance: United States
- Branch/service: Illinois Militia
- Years of service: 1827–1847
- Rank: Lieutenant Colonel, Captain
- Commands: Commander of the 31st (Sangamon) Regiment of Illinois Militia
- Battles/wars: American Indian Wars, Winnebago War, Black Hawk War, Mexican-American War

Achilles Morris (May 8, 1800 – February 15, 1847) was an American politician and military officer who served as Abraham Lincoln's commanding officer in 1832 during the Black Hawk War and defeated Lincoln in the Illinois House of Representatives election for Sangamon County the same year. Seven years later in 1839 Morris served as the Vice President of the Democratic-Republican Party of Illinois, and in 1840, Lincoln authored a bill for an Act to Establish a State Road from Petersburg in Menard County to Waverly in Morgan County where he appointed Achilles Morris as Commissioner. Morris later served alongside Lincoln at the Railroad Convention in 1845. The chairman of the convention was Samuel H. Treat, and the delegates elected were Nathaniel Pope, David J. Baker, John J. Hardin, Josiah Lamborn, Thomas Lewis, Abraham Lincoln, and Achilles Morris. Morris was a Jacksonian democrat.

In 1846, Achilles Morris returned to military service to lead a volunteer company from Sangamon County in the Mexican American War. He died in Mexico from disease on February 15, 1847, and was buried with full military honors.

== Early life ==
Achilles Morris was born in Kanawha County, Virginia in present-day Marmet, West Virginia to Benjamin Morris (born 1770), a veteran of the Northwest Indian Wars. The Morris family in Kanawha County were the first permanent European-Colonial settlers in the region beginning in 1773. Morris's uncles included Justice and Sheriff Leonard Morris a former Virginia spy under George Washington, Virginia State House representative William Morris Jr, Capt. John Morris the commander of Kanawha County's ranger company, Joshua Morris, and Henry Morris.

Morris's cousins included US Representative Calvary Morris, Bishop Thomas Asbury Morris, Virginia state representative Edmund Morris, Indiana Lt. Governor Major Gen. Milton Stapp, Colonel James T. B. Stapp who was nominated by President Zachary Taylor and served as the Receiver of Monies for the Land Office of Vandalia, and Capt. Wyatt Berry Stapp who Wyatt Earp was named after.

Achilles Morris's grandparents were William Morris, and Elizabeth "Eliza" Stapp Morris. Eliza was the daughter of a prominent tobacco planter Joshua Stapp. William. He was born in England in 1722, worked alongside George Hume in Orange County, Virginia, who Washington served under as deputy surveyor in 1748. William later served as a Lieutenant in the French and Indian War, and purchased a tract of land in Culpeper, Virginia in the 1750s from Hume that bordered House of Burgesses member, Henry Field. William's land was originally granted to Alexander Spotswood until his death.

In 1822, Morris married his cousin Leah Jarrett and initially moved to Cabell County, Virginia. Four years later, in 1826, he relocated his family to Sangamon County, Illinois alongside his wife's family, Jonathan Jarrett and others, joining his cousins James T. B. Stapp and Wyatt Berry Stapp who had taken up residence a few years earlier. The move to Illinois coincided with the death of his grandfather, James Jarrett. Jarrett owned the Salt mine on the Burning Springs tract, which George Washington attempted unsuccessfully to secure the rights to. Jarrett's Salt mine was sold for $12,500 and directed the proceeds be distributed among his 18 heirs for the purpose of purchasing land out west.

== Winnebago and Black Hawk War ==
In 1827, Morris commissioned as a 2nd Lieutenant in the US Indian Wars in Illinois's Mounted Riflemen Regiment during the Winnebago War.

In 1831, Morris was promoted to Captain, and he commanded a volunteer company from Sangamon County in the Sauk and Fox War (Sac and Fox), which led to the Black Hawk War. The governor, John Reynolds, called up a volunteer force to "repel the invasion of the British Band". The troops marched to the Black Hawks's village on June 25, 1831. Five days later, the Black Hawks signed a treaty stating that they would not return to the east side of the river except by express permission of the government. Captain Morris was present during the signing of the treaty.

In 1832 at the start of the Black Hawk War, Morris served as the captain of his own company under Colonel Samuel M. Thompson in the Fourth Regiment, and was elected by his unit as their major. In this election, Abraham Lincoln was promoted from private to captain. Four days later, due to a vacancy in the unit, Morris was promoted to Lieutenant Colonel of the 4th Illinois Regiment of Mounted Volunteers, overseeing the troops from Sangamon County. Captain Abraham Lincoln was one of his subordinate commanders. His brigade commander was Samuel Whiteside.

During the war Morris served alongside his cousins Colonel James T. B. Stapp (aide-de-camp) and Colonel Wyatt Berry Stapp as well as with Major Zachary Taylor, General Andrew Jackson, and Lieutenant Jefferson Davis.

After the hostilities subdued Morris was discharged as Lt. Colonel, Whiteside was discharged as General, and Lincoln as Captain; however, with the threat of potential Native American attacks still looming, the Governor authorized an "odd" company in Sangamon County led by Capt. Elijah Iles and known as the "Independent Spy Battalion". Lt. Colonel Morris, General Whiteside, and Captain Lincoln all enlisted as privates during this 30-day period.

== Illinois House of Representatives Election of 1832 ==
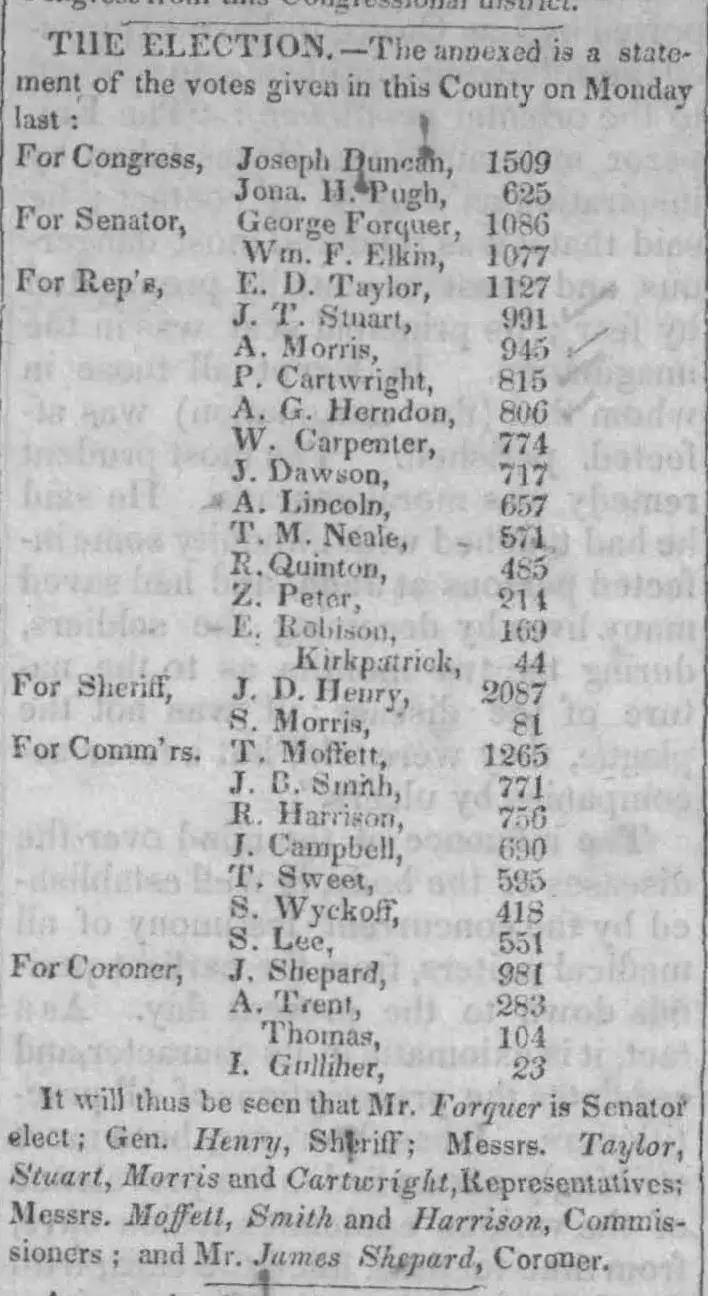
Election Results for Illinois House of Representatives 1832 – Abraham Lincoln Loss

On March 22, 1832, the Sangamon County Journal published the names of the men running for Representatives of Sangamon County, including John Dawson, Archer Herndon, Thomas Neale, John T. Stuart, Achilles Morris, and Abraham Lincoln. By July 19, 1832, the list had grown to ten candidates. Nearly all the candidates running for election were participating in the Black Hawk War simultaneously.

On August 6, 1832, Achilles Morris was elected to one of the four seats representing Sangamon County in the Illinois House of Representatives to the 8th Illinois General Assembly. Three of those seats were largely uncontested. Edmund Dick Taylor was running for his second term and was highly favored and liked by the electorate, Taylor also had the support of the Governor.

John T. Stuart, an attorney was also highly favored, and had just come off serving as a major in the war that boosted his popularity. Peter Cartwright was a preacher, who served as a chaplain during the War of 1812 and also served in the Illinois House of Representatives from 1828 to 1830, was also expected to win a seat. Which left only one truly open seat that the men were vying for, a total of thirteen candidates – or rather 10 candidates attempting to gain enough votes to secure the final seat.

The top four candidates with the most votes were elected. Taylor received the most votes with 1,127 votes, followed by Stuart with 991 votes, Morris with 945 votes, and Cartwright with 815 votes. Lincoln finished a distant 8th place with 657 votes.

Morris served on two committees: On Public Accounts and Expenditures, and Elections.

== Politics ==
Less than a week after taking office, on December 7, 1832, Morris introduced a resolution on the internal improvement to draft a memorial to Congress for Congress to relinquish all fractional parts of land on the Sangamon river for the purpose of removing obstructions in the river.

At the end of his term, Achilles chose not to seek re-election.

In 1835 Morris was elected as a delegate to represent Sangamon County for the 1835 Democratic National Convention.

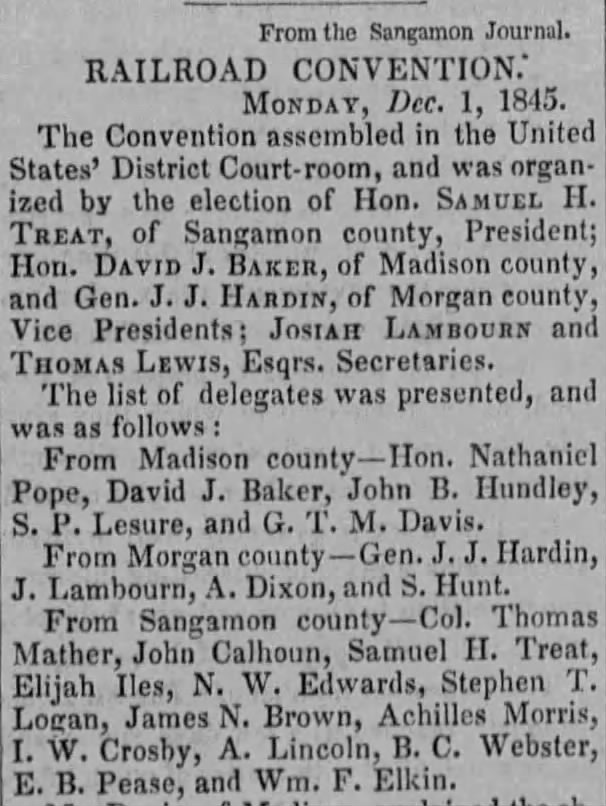
Railroad Convention 1845, Abraham Lincoln and Achilles Morris from Sangamon County

In July 1836, the political contest between the Whigs and the Democrats turned violent. Ninian Wirt Edwards, the former Attorney General of Illinois drew a pistol on the "prominent democrat" Achilles Morris, during the Congressional race between John T. Stuart and S. A. Douglas. Morris, asserting Edwards to be a coward, challenged him to a real fight. Witnesses of the event describe Morris and Edwards fighting in Herndon's grocery. After the fight Stuart ordered out a barrel of whiskey and wine.

In 1837, Morris was elected as Secretary of the Democratic Party of Sangamon County for the State of Illinois. Morris was also nominated and elected in 1837 as a delegate to the Democratic Convention.

In 1840 Morris was nominated and elected again as delegate for the Democratic Convention.

In 1842 Morris was the Democratic Nominee for Sangamon County for the Illinois House of Representative, lost by less than 29 votes.

On December 1, 1845, he served on the Delegation for Railroad, and Delegate for Illinois Democratic Convention alongside Abraham Lincoln.

On February 6, 1846, Morris was nominated and elected as a delegate for the Gubernatorial race at the State Democratic Convention for Sangamon County.

== Mexican American War ==
Achilles Morris volunteered to raise a volunteer company to fight in the Mexican War in May 1846. In June 9, Morris's company was fully assembled and made up Company D, Regiment of Illinois Volunteers, commanded by Congressman Edward D. Baker of Springfield.

Captain Morris died on February 15, 1847, and was buried with full honors. His funeral was described in the journal of his former soldier John Nevin King,

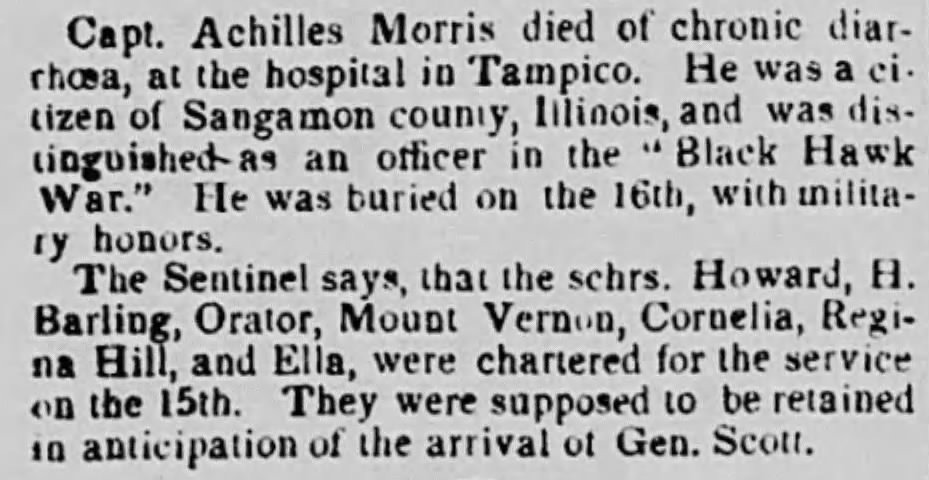
Capt. Achilles Morris Funeral

He writes, “He was buried today in the Honors of war. He had a fine funeral and a very large one. Company A & part of two or three other companies were detailed to fire over his grave. There was nearly 70 men. Our company in full Uniform, Blue pants, Blue Cloth Caps and white coats marched after the Hearse in which were the remains of the much beloved Captain. Everything was done in a proper manner. He had a very nice plain Coffin, and a large Brass Band, the band of the Second Regiment of Artillery. Many Regular Officers were at the funeral."

Among the other family members who died in Capt. Morris's company included his cousins Jacob Morris, Milton Morris, and David Jarrett.
