= Leonard Morris (spy) =

American attorney, justice and soldier (1748–1831)

Honorable Leonard Morris

Justice of Kanawha County
- In office October 6, 1789 – May, 1831
- Appointed by: Virginia House of Delegates

Sheriff of Kanawha County
- In office 1798–1801
- Appointed by: Virginia House of Delegates
- Preceded by: Thomas Lewis Jr.
- Succeeded by: William Morris

Commissioner of Kanawha County
- In office 1794 – May 17, 1831

Personal details
- Born: Orange County, Virginia
- Died: May 17, 1831 Marmet, West Virginia
- Spouse(s): Margaret Price (m.1770); Margaret Larkin (m.1789)
- Occupation: Spy, Justice

Military service
- Allegiance: Thirteen Colonies
- Branch: Virginia Militia
- Service years: 1774-1789
- Unit: Augusta County Militia; Greenbrier County Militia
- Conflict: Revolutionary War

Leonard Morris, Esq (1748 – May 17, 1831) was an American spy, justice and sheriff, and was one of the founders of Charleston, West Virginia in 1789. From 1774 - 1777, Leonard was a soldier in the Augusta County militia. In 1778, when Greenbrier county was formed, Leonard's brother William was appointed Captain of a Ranger Company, where Leonard received his commission from the governor as a spy. After the American Revolution, Leonard was granted large tracts of land in the Kanawha Region and became a freeholder. When Kanawha County was formed in 1789, Leonard was appointed justice of Kanawha County and a member of the part of the gentry class. Leonard was serving as an agent for the state of Virginia under General Andrew Lewis and George Washington.

Five years later, Leonard was named as one of the trustees of Charleston when the town was incorporated by the Virginia House of Delegates in 1794, alongside Ruben Slaughter, Andrew Donnally Sr, John Young and William Morris. William Morris Jr, and Young were also spies from 1778 to 1782 and subsequently rewarded appropriately.

Leonard replaced John Alderson as sheriff in 1798. Alderson demanded backdated taxes to be paid on lands owned by Bushrod Washington or risk forfeiture, Bushrod sent a letter to his uncle, President George Washington, on January 9, 1798, stating the sheriff of Kanawha County, John Alderson, was levying heavy tax deficits against Bushrod and George's property in Kanawha; George responds ten days later in a letter to Bushrod agreeing to assist in the matter. Leonard, was deemed as the appropriate replacement.

== Early life and family ==
Leonard was born in Orange County, Virginia (later Culpeper) to British born William Morris and Elizabeth Stapp. Elizabeth's father, Joshua Stapp was of the planter class who conducted business with James Madison Sr. and maintained several tobacco plantations to include one along the James River in the Varina Farms. Leonard grew up in Culpeper County, Virginia around colonial elites including Colonel Henry Field who served as in the House of Burgesses and Aide-de-camp of General Lewis and George Hume. The land was originally granted to land of the late Lt. Governor Alexander Spotswood, Hume's first cousin. Henry Field was the first cousin of Colonel John Field who died during the Battle of Point Pleasant in 1774, whose land adjoined Henry's on the opposite side.

Leonard had sixteen children, six by his first wife Margaret Price: John, Meredith, Mary, Sarah, Elizabeth, and Leonard Jr.; and ten children by his second wife Margaret Larkin (Lykins): Charles, Nancy, Parthenia, Joshua, Hiram, Peter, Andrew, Cynthia, Madison and Dickinson.

Leonard's daughter Elizabeth married Robert Lewis the granddaughter of John Lewis (cousin of General Andrew Lewis).

Leonard's brother William Jr "Old Billy" served in the Virginia House of Delegates representing Kanawha County for a single term, until his son replaced him (also named William) beginning in 1796 after William III finished college at Lexington. His brother, John was appointed Captain of Kanawha County militia alongside Daniel Boone who served as Colonel, John is the father of US Congressman Calvary Morris, and Bishop Thomas Asbury Morris. Leonard's brother Benjamin's son was Achilles Morris, who served as a Lt. Col in the Black Hawk War and defeated Abraham Lincoln in the election of 1832.

Leonard's brother Henry Morris, married Mary Bird whose extended family included Patrick Henry, and General Andrew Lewis through her mother's side (Margaret Dean). Mary's uncle was Col. Abraham Bird, member of the House of Burgesses.

== Lord Dunmore's War ==
While never being listed on any muster rolls during the Battle of Point Pleasant like his brothers (John, William Jr, and Henry Morris) - some historians assert Leonard Morris fought in the battle in 1774, however this claim has never borne any evidence While Lord Dunmore's 180 day war was ongoing, Leonard resided at Fort Morris (also known as Kelly's Post) positioned along the Kanawha River. The Morris Fort was established in early 1774 near the mouth of Catfish Shoals on the Kanawha River and build on the ruins of Walter Kelly's home.

Fort Morris was built to have a dedicated established hub for Virginians along the Kanawha River, and was used by Lord Dunmore's men who were on their way to action against Chief Cornstalk.

In November 1774, while occupying Fort Morris, Leonard received a guard of ten soldiers who remained until the settlers were safe from Indians. Some time later, in one of the last raids in the region the Indians kidnapped Sallie, one of Leonard's maids, and though Morris and twenty men followed the Indians as far as Guyandotte they were unable to obtain her release. The war party was of a couple hundred, and their ransom was too great that they could not get Sallie back.

From 1777 through 1782, Morris was commissioned as spy by Patrick Henry for the State of Virginia during the American Revolution, tracking hostile Indian movements in Greenbrier and Kanawha along with his brother-in-law John Jones. Morris also worked alongside Lt. John Young who was newly commissioned under Captain William Morris's Ranger Company as a spy.

== Revolutionary and Indian Wars ==
From March to July 1789 in support of the Northwest Indian Wars, Leonard supplied the Kanawha County Militia Rangers war materials amounting to £118, 3 shilling and 9 pence.On August 10, 1789, Leonard and William Morris Jr. were listed as having sold/provided additional war materials to Colonel George Clendenin, 26 Privates, 2 Sergeants, one Ensign, one Lieutenant, and one Captain. The Militia company was renamed in October 1789 to the Morris' Company of Rangers, led by Capt. John Morris.

Leonard Morris's farm and stock raising was instrumental to the war effort, from May 1791 through September 30, 1791, Capt. John Morris provided Leonard's farm with soldiers until September 30, 1791, protecting his and neighboring the lands from hostile forces. The Ranger company was listed in a March 24, 1792 report to the Governor of Virginia, Henry Lee III as "having adopted full and effectual measures for the defense of the Western Frontier."

== Appointment to Justice ==
On October 6, 1789, the Virginia House of Delegates appointed Leonard Morris as Justice of the newly established Kanawha County, and was sworn in as member of the County Court. The first official court appearance in Kanawha County was held in the house of Colonel George Clendenin. On this occasion several of the newly appointed Justices were sworn in as members of the Court including Thomas Lewis Jr., and Daniel Boone.

In late 1792, Leonard Morris, testified before the court regarding a land dispute between George Washington and Ruben Slaughter. Slaughter notified Washington of his taking custody of the 250-acre tract of land known as the Burning Springs Tract. Burning Springs was previously patented by General George Washington in 1774 after Captain Thomas Bullitt's group of surveyors mapped out the Kanawha in the year previous, which included Joshua Morris, Capt. Matthew Arbuckle, the Reverend John Alderson, John and Peter Van Bibber, McAfee brothers, McCown, Adams from the New River settlements, along with Hancock Taylor. Leonard stated that in 1775, he saw surveyors Samuel Lewis and John Stuart making a survey of the tract. Samuel Lewis was the son of General Andrew Lewis; a portion of the patent was later granted to Washington and Lewis, and signed by Thomas Jefferson, then Governor of Virginia.

"And the said Leonard Morris, being produced as a witness for the plaintiff, after being first duly sworn, deposeth and saith: That in the year 1775, this deponent was residing on Kanawha river about six miles from Burning Spring Tract. During that year, Messrs. Samuel Lewis, a surveyor, Colo John Stuart, of Greenbrier, and Thomas Bullitt were on the Kanawha surveying lands, and procured from out of this deponent's family, Mungo Price and his son as chain carriers; that after the party returned from surveying, this deponent understood from them that they had surveyed the Burning Spring Tract for the late General George Washington (now President) and Andrew Lewis. This deponent, with the exception of some periods when the Indian wars made it hazardous to keep a family on Kanawha, has made it his principal residence since 1775. Sometimes during the Indian troubles, this deponent's family resided altogether in Greenbrier."

In 1794 Morris was named Commissioner for Kanawha County; 1795, Surveyor of Roads for Kanawha County;and, in 1798 named Sheriff of Kanawha County.

== Later life ==
Historical records show Leonard Morris owned 18 slaves in Kanawha County, Virginia in 1820. In 1836, Mararget his wife, erected a Church in Leonard, Ebenezer Chapel (Marmet, West Virginia) which was built by Morris's slaves. Leonard Morris is the founder of the City of Marmet, and the great-grandfather of Benjamin Franklin Morris who served as Marmet's mayor. Leonard Morris also founded Lens Creek on the Kanawha River

== Misconceptions ==
Several misconceptions of Leonard Morris exist including Leonard was a commissioned officer who arose to the rank of Colonel. Leonard was never commissioned as an officer in the Virginia Militia or Continental Army. Leonard was a commissioned spy acting as an agent for the Virginia Assembly and Governor. Leonard was subsequently left off most muster rolls due to Leonard being a state agent, rather than militiaman and paid through the Governor's Office.

Leonard and all his brothers (to include Benjamin Morris, who was aged four at the time) served in the Battle of Point Pleasant. Dunmore's muster rolls and paysheets only list three of William Morris's children as serving, William Jr, Henry, and John. It is said "in the early days of the war" Leonard maintained the Fort at Kelly's Post.
