= Ebenezer Chapel (Marmet, West Virginia) =

Historic church in West Virginia, United States

- U.S. National Register of Historic Places
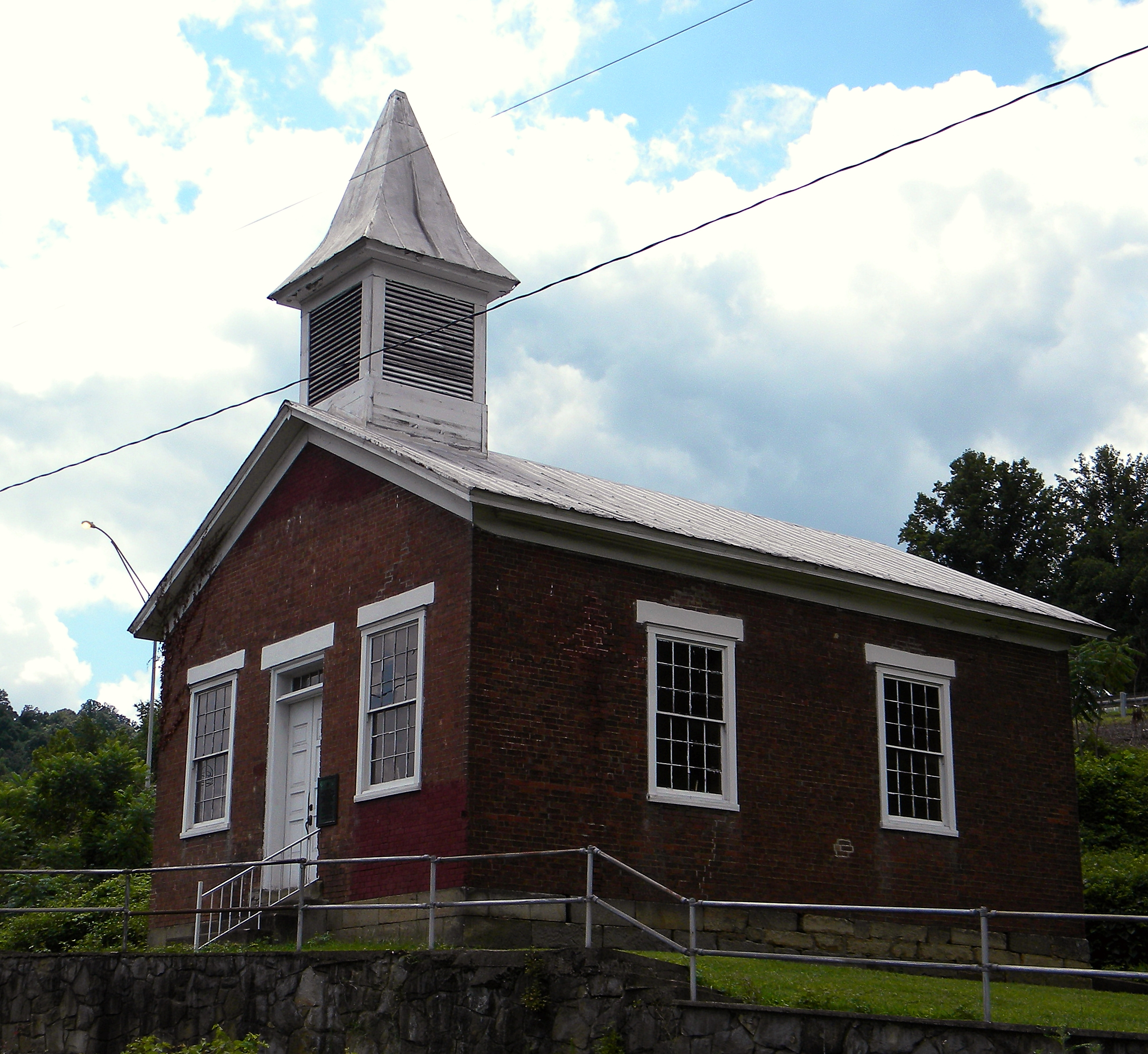
- Ebenezer Chapel in Marmet, West Virginia

- Location within West Virginia Location within the United States
- Location: Ohio Ave., S at Hillview Dr., Marmet, West Virginia
- Coordinates: 38°14′30″N 81°33′59″W
- Area: 1 acre (0.40 ha)
- Built: 1836
- NRHP reference No.: 74002011
- Added to NRHP: December 16, 1974

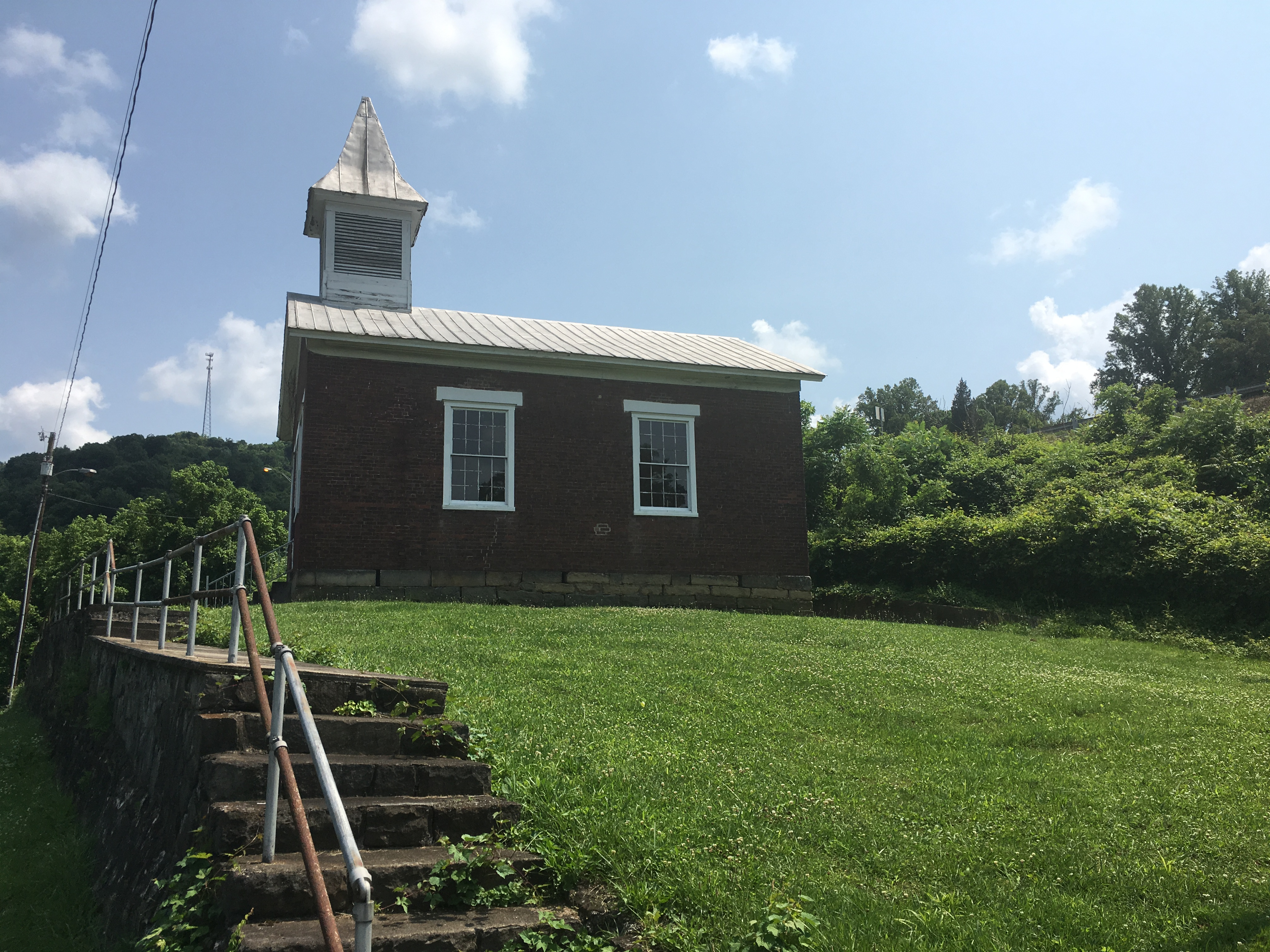
Ebenezer Chapel, WV - Outside, taken June 1st 2019

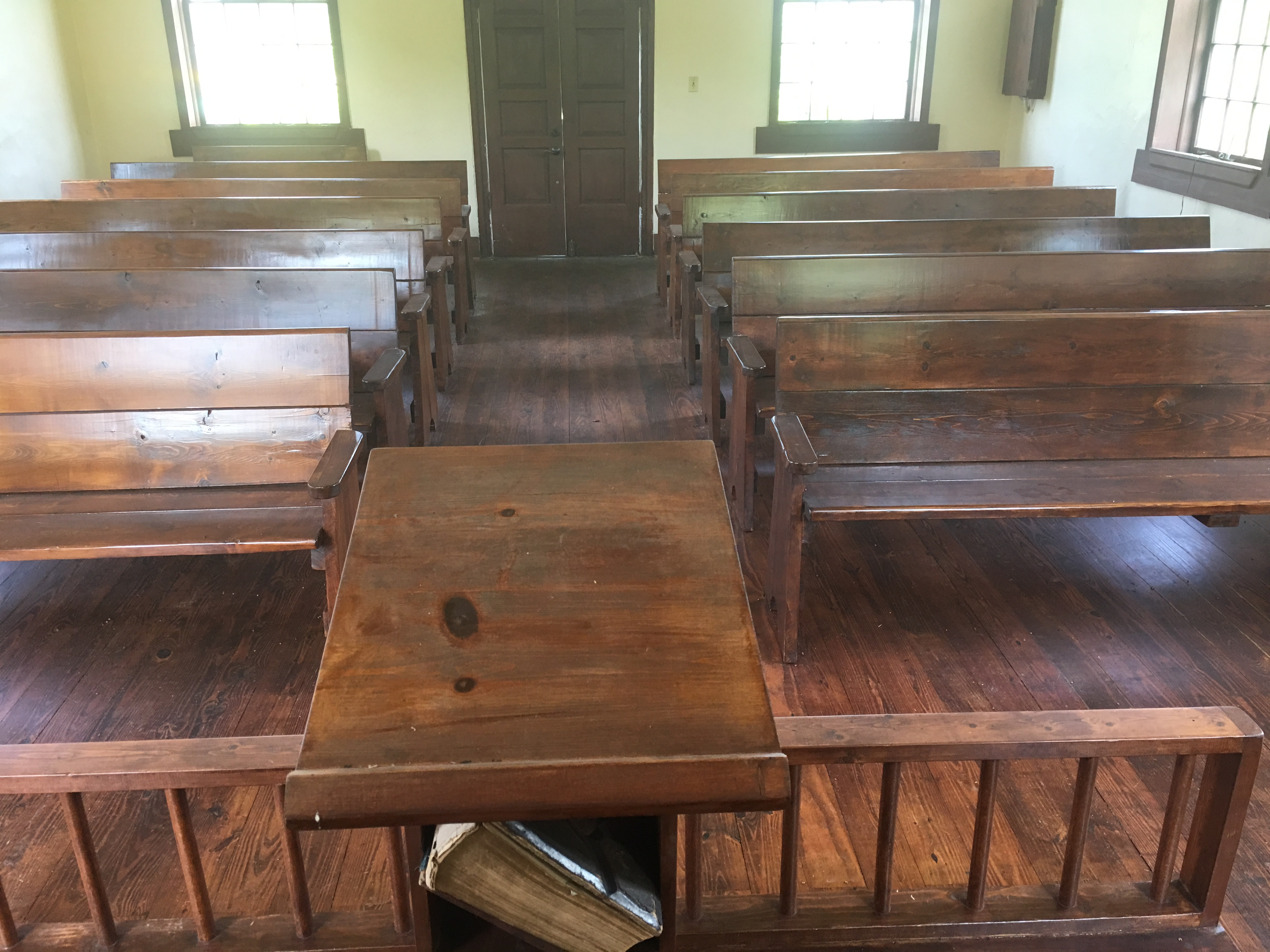
Ebenezer Chapel, WV - Inside the Chapel from the Podium

Ebenezer Chapel (also known as Marmet Christian Church) is a historic chapel on Ohio Avenue, south at Hillview Drive in Marmet, West Virginia.

== Origins ==
The chapel was built in 1836 by slaves owned by Marmet's first settler, Leonard Morris. Mr. Morris originally named the area Elizaville. By 1848, the building was owned by Luke Wilcox, a local farmer and manager of a local salt works. The chapel was for many years part of a circuit traveled by preachers of the United Methodist Episcopal Church.

== Civil War ==
During the American Civil War (1861-1865) the chapel served as a military headquarters and as a hospital for Union soldiers. Camp Piatt (present day Belle, WV) sits immediately across the river where today DuPont sits.

Jacob Conrad Edelmann was a German immigrant who worked on the river in Brownstown (present day Marmet). While under Confederate occupation in the Fall of 1862, Mr. Edelmann made extra money grinding grain for the Confederates. In 1863, Jacob Conrad Edelmann was arrested by Union soldiers and locked inside the chapel for 3 days. He begged for foreign protection, as he was not a United States citizen, and was released on these grounds. After the war, he went on to become a US citizen.

== Saved from Demolition ==
Ebenezer Chapel was saved from destruction by a committee led by local historian and teacher, Russell Hansford. The West Virginia Turnpike was being constructed at the time and the state wanted to demolish the church. Russell Hansford added the chapel to the National Register of Historic Places in 1974, thus preserving it for generations to come.

== Today ==
Ebenezer Chapel is the oldest structure in Marmet (and the Kanawha Valley.) It is the only remaining link between today's generation and the first settlers of the area. It is currently the home of the Elizaville Historical Society and hosts an annual Civil War weekend.
