= William Morris (Virginia politician) =

American politician and soldier (1746–1802)

William Morris Jr.

Member of the Virginia House of Delegates from the Kanawha County district
- In office 1792–1794
- Succeeded by: Thomas Lewis Jr.

Personal details
- Born: 1746 Orange County, Colony of Virginia
- Died: 1802 (aged 55–56) Kanawha County, Virginia
- Party: Federalist
- Spouse: Catherine Carroll
- Occupation: Spy, military officer
- Profession: Politician
- Military career
- Allegiance: Thirteen Colonies
- Branch: Virginia Militia
- Service years: 1774–1792
- Rank: Major
- Unit: Morris' Company of Rangers
- Conflicts: Lord Dunmore's War American Revolutionary War Northwest Indian Wars Whiskey Rebellion

William Morris Jr., Esq. (December 17, 1746 – November 6, 1802) also known as "Old Billy", was a Virginia military officer, spy, sheriff and politician who served in the Virginia House of Delegates representing in Kanawha County, Virginia from 1792-1794. Morris served alongside Daniel Boone during the American Revolution, and is best known as the first permanent European settler in the Kanawha Valley, and often misrepresented for his father. Two years before his death in 1800, Morris was appointed as one of the commissioners for supervising the Presidential Election between Thomas Jefferson and John Adams. He was also associated to James Monroe, who Morris exchanged letters with during his time in the Virginia House during Monroe's tenure as governor.

== Family ==
William Morris Jr. is the son of William Morris, a veteran of the French and Indian War, and Elizabeth Stapp from Orange County, Virginia. Stapp was the daughter of tobacco Planter Joshua Stapp. William had nine siblings: Henry, Leonard, Joshua, John, Achilles, Levi, Elizabeth, Benjamin and Frances.

William was a cousin by marriage to Daniel Boone, through brother's Leonard's second wife Margaret Lykins (Larkin) - a descendant of Sven Gunnarsson.

William's children include notably William Morris (b.1775), soldier, inventor and politician who served in the Virginia House of Delegates from 1796 to 1807; Jane (b.1770) who married Major John Hansford who also served in the Virginia House from 1811 to 1818; and Carroll Morris (b.1779) who served in the Virginia House in 1804.

William's notable nephews include United States House of Representatives Calvary Morris, bishop Thomas Asbury Morris, Illinois House Representative Lt. Col. Achilles Morris (who defeated Abraham Lincoln in 1832), and Edmund Morris who served in the Virginia House in 1808.

== Early life and surveys ==
William married Catherine Carroll on May 10, 1768, in Orange, Virginia. Catherine's sister Mary wed Rev. John Alderson (March 5, 1738 - March 1821). The two moved their family to Augusta County, Virginia near Muddy Creek alongside William's brothers John,Leonard Morris, and John Jones (brother in law) shortly thereafter.

In February 1773 William Morris, John Morris, John Jones, Walter Kelly, John Herd, James Campbell, James Pauley, Peter Shoemaker, Curtis Alderson (brother of John Alderson), John Alderson, Archibald Taylor and Philip Cooper set out from Muddy Creek, part of the New River settlements, to make land improvements in the Kanawha Valley. According to court testimony in 1800 and 1832, William and John Morris were identified as brothers.

The Bullitt Expedition occurred two months later departing from the New River in April 1773. This group included approximately 40 men, Joshua Morris (brother of William), Captain Matthew Arbuckle, Rev. John Alderson, John Van Bibber, Peter Van Bibber, John Field and others.

According to the testimony of John Jones in his Revolutionary War pension, William, John Morris, Walter Kelly, James Campbell and others had begun to settle in spring of 1773. Another account by Col. John Stuart and others detailed, "In the Spring of 1773, a few individuals had begun to make improvements on the Kanawha River below the falls, and some land adventurers were making surveys in the same section."

Contemporary research conducted in the 1900s stated "William Morris Sr" moved his "entire family" to Kanawha but was a misidentification. William Morris Sr. did bring his family to the valley, yet the figure referred to as "William Morris Sr." confuses William with his father who resided in Culpeper until the 1780s. This error likely stems from the common practice of referring to the elder William as "Sr." to distinguish him from his son.

== Military service ==
After an increase in hostilities between the Mingo and Shawnee whose chief was Cornstalk, Lt. Governor of Virginia John Murray ordered an army of militia to be raised to confront Cornstalk at Point Pleasant. William, John Morris and John Jones joined Capt. Arbuckle's ranger company who served at the front. Henry Morris would serve in Capt. John Lewis's company, the son of Andrew Lewis. Leonard would remain at Kelly's post, and would not officially serve in the engagement. A separate, unrelated William Morris served in Major Haynes company from Bedford County. While the commander of the operation was Andrew Lewis, his brother Colonel Charles Lewis was commanding the southern division composed of men from Augusta, and surrounding counties. At the time of the Battle of Point Pleasant in 1774, Andrew Lewis held the rank of colonel but is often regarded as "General" due to his post 1774 military title.

Capt. Arbuckle's company was part of the Botetourt militia, who served alongside Capt. Robert McClanahan's company.

In the Battle of Point Pleasant, Charles Lewis, a former member of the House of Burgesses, led the Augusta County regiment into combat after a surprise attack from the natives early in the morning. Tragically, he was mortally wounded early in the fight, while wearing his scarlet jacket, even after he was struck, he waited until a line had been formed before going to be treated. Matthew Arbuckle's brother, William, married the widow of Capt. Robert McClanahan, who also died during the engagement.

During the American Revolutionary War, William served in the August County Militia until 1778 when Greenbrier was established as a new Virginia County. William was appointed as captain of one of the newly formed Ranger companies. His brother Leonard and brother in law John Jones would receive a commission from the Virginia General Assembly signed by Patrick Henry as spies who served under William's company.

In March 1783, William commissioned John Young as a lieutenant and assigned him as a spy. Lieutenant Young's principal role was to lead troops in surveilling, engaging, and reporting on Indian movements throughout the Greenbrier and Kanawha region. William's unit garrison was at Morris Fort (also known as Kelly's Post) from 1784 until 1786.

Morris was promoted to major in 1786, serving in the Northwest Indian Wars and Whiskey Rebellion in the Ohio; although in most documents his is always referred to as "Captain". William's company of rangers primary mission was to track and report hostile Indian movements of the Mingo, Shawnee and Six Nations who aligned with the loyalists to include Simon Girty's aligned tribes who frequently attacked in the Kanawha, Ohio, and Kentucky regions.

In 1786, Morris received 5,000 acres of land for his military service, 2,800 of those acres were in Fayette County.

== Post war career ==
In 1792, William Morris was elected alongside Daniel Boone as a Representative to Kanawha County in the Virginia House of Delegates. He served until 1794. His son William had recently finished the college at Lexington and replaced his father beginning in 1796 session. William was a member of the Federalist party. William was dually serving as justice for Kanawha County since 1789.

On November 11, 1792, Rep. William Morris wrote a letter to Governor Beverley Randolph for additional troops and a company to be added at Coal River. He also requested in the region, four additional scouts and 12 additional men at Point Pleasant, amongst other areas.

In the October Session of 1794, William was appointed as a trustee of the newly incorporated town of Charleston (now the capital city of West Virginia) along with Ruben Slaughter, Andrew Donnally Sr, William Clendenin, John Morris, Leonard Morris, George Alderson, Abraham Baker, and John Young. William took over for Daniel Boone as a member of the Virginia House of Delegates for Kanawha County who held the post in 1791.

On December 1, 1794, William wrote a letter to Governor Brooke requesting compensation be paid to John Van Bibber, and provided an affidavit relating to rations provided to soldiers during the Northwest Indian Wars led by Col. Boone.

On December 27, 1794, William wrote a letter to Governor Robert Brooke stating that he had provided rations and provisions for two of Col. John Steele's companies in February 1792 where he acted as a contractor to the state and requested compensation for his services.

In 1800, William was appointed Sheriff of Kanawha County until his death in 1802, replacing his brother Leonard Morris. The position, officially titled "High Sheriff" at the time, was a senior member of the court and one had to be a justice in order to qualify. In 1801, Morris had a high-stakes case relating to a freed man who was kidnapped and resold into slavery. The case of Jack Neal involved Neal, a freed slave, being smuggled to Tennessee where Neal broke out of his chains and killed his kidnappers at night while on the River.

The following year, in December 1802, William Morris died at the age of 52
