= Electoral history of Abraham Lincoln =

Elections featuring President of the US

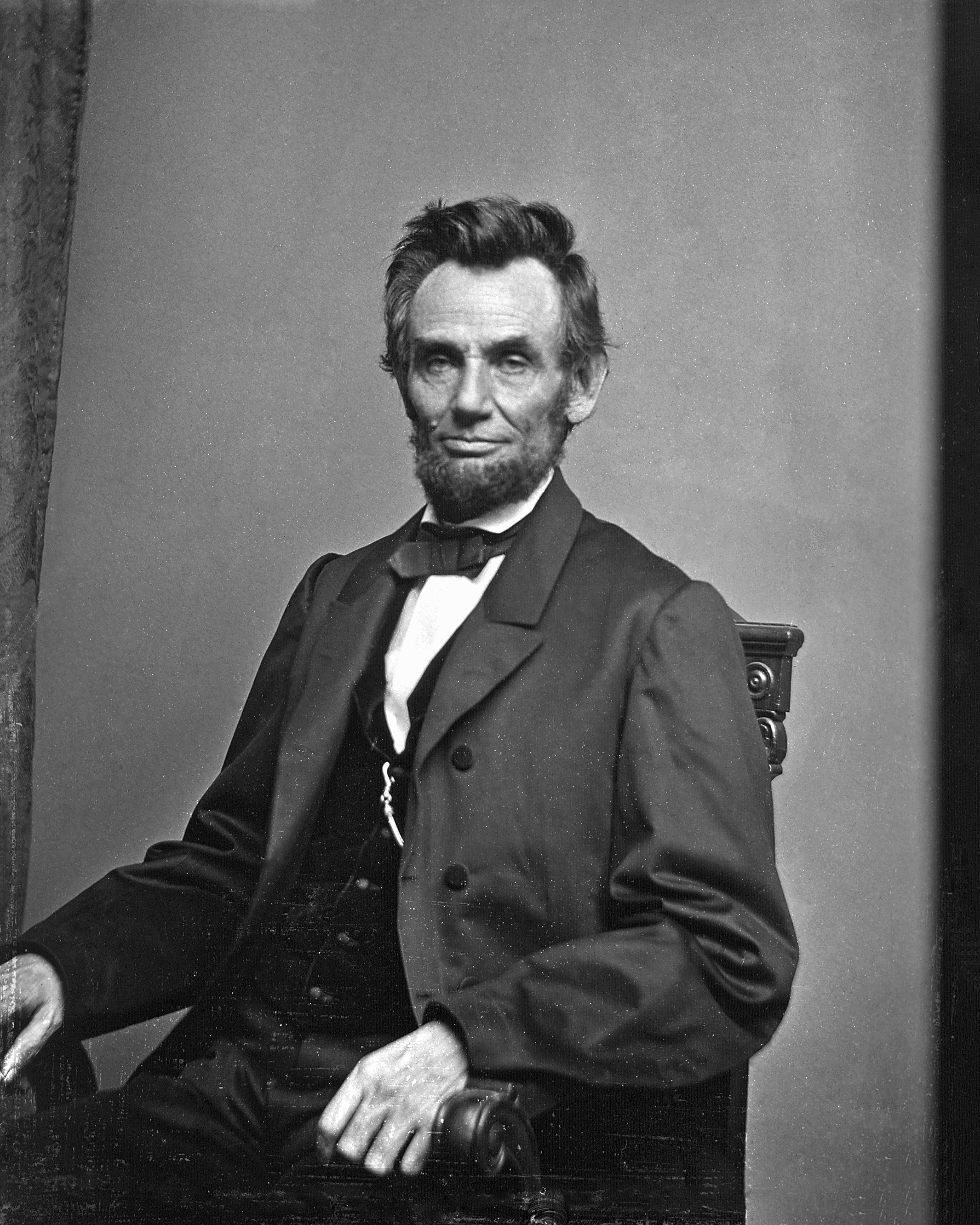
Lincoln in 1864

This is the electoral history of Abraham Lincoln. Lincoln served one term in the United States House of Representatives from Illinois (1847–1849). He later served as the 16th president of the United States (1861–1865).

== Illinois House of Representatives ==
Illinois Sangamon County House District General Election, 1832
Party	Candidate	Votes	%
Nonpartisan	Edmund D. Taylor	1,127	13.55
Nonpartisan	John T. Stuart	991	11.92
Nonpartisan	Achilles Morris	945	11.37
Nonpartisan	Peter Cartwright	815	9.80
Nonpartisan	Archer G. Herndon	806	9.69
Democratic?	William Carpenter	774	9.31
Nonpartisan	John Dawson	717	8.62
Nonpartisan	Abraham Lincoln	657	7.90
Nonpartisan	Thomas M. Neale	571	6.87
Nonpartisan	Richard Quinton	485	5.83
Nonpartisan	Zachariah Peters	214	2.57
Nonpartisan	Edward Robinson	169	2.03
Nonpartisan	William Kirkpatrick	44	0.53
Total votes		8,315	100.0

Illinois Sangamon County House District General Election, 1834
Party	Candidate	Votes	%
White Party	John Dawson	1,390	16.22
Whig	Abraham Lincoln	1,376	16.06
Democratic	William Carpenter	1,170	13.65
Whig	John T. Stuart (incumbent)	1,164	13.58
Nonpartisan	Richard Quinton	1,038	12.11
White Party	Andrew McCormick	694	8.10
Nonpartisan	William Alvey	613	7.15
White Party	Thomas M. Neale	514	6.00
Nonpartisan	Shadrick J. Campbell	192	2.24
Independent?	James Shepherd	154	1.80
Whig?	James Baker	130	1.52
Nonpartisan	John Durley	92	1.07
Nonpartisan	William Kendall	42	0.49
Total votes		8,569	100.0

Illinois Sangamon County House District General Election, 1836
Party	Candidate	Votes	%
Whig	Abraham Lincoln (incumbent)	1,716	9.39
Whig	William F. Elkin	1,694	9.27
Whig	Ninian W. Edwards	1,659	9.08
Whig	John Dawson (incumbent)	1,641	8.98
Harrison Party	Daniel Stone	1,438	7.87
Nonpartisan	Robert L. Wilson	1,353	7.40
Whig	Andrew McCormick	1,306	7.14
Democratic	John Calhoun	1,278	6.99
Nonpartisan	Jacob M. Early	1,194	6.53
Nonpartisan	Richard Quinlon	1,137	6.22
Nonpartisan	Thomas Winn	972	5.32
Democratic?	Aaron Vandiver	922	5.04
Nonpartisan	Michael Mann	913	4.99
Democratic	George Power	905	4.95
Anti-Junto Whig	James Baker	101	0.55
Nonpartisan	John L. Thompson	38	0.21
Nonpartisan	Yancy	12	0.07
Total votes		18,279	100.0

Illinois Sangamon County House District General Election, 1838
Party	Candidate	Votes	%
Whig	Abraham Lincoln (incumbent)	1,803	8.87
Whig	Ninian W. Edwards (incumbent)	1,779	8.75
Whig	Edward Dickinson Baker	1,745	8.58
Democratic	John Calhoun	1,711	8.41
Whig	William F. Elkin (incumbent)	1,688	8.30
Whig	John Dawson (incumbent)	1,614	7.94
Whig	Andrew McCormick (incumbent)	1,569	7.72
Nonpartisan	Thomas J. Vance	1,537	7.56
Nonpartisan	Moses K. Anderson	1,506	7.41
Democratic	Harry Riggin	1,318	6.48
Nonpartisan	Thomas Skinner	1,222	6.01
Anti-Junto Party	Davis Robinson	1,167	5.74
Nonpartisan	Francis Reegnier	1,069	5.26
Anti-Junto Whig	Wharton Ransdell	228	1.12
Anti-Junto Whig	William Hacknay	198	0.97
Anti-Junto Whig	James Baker	182	0.89
Total votes		20,336	100.0

Illinois Sangamon County House District General Election, 1840
Party	Candidate	Votes	%
Whig	James M. Bradford	1,859	12.13
Whig	James N. Brown	1,857	12.12
Whig	John Darneille	1,852	12.08
Whig	Josiah Francis	1,846	12.05
Whig	Abraham Lincoln (incumbent)	1,844	12.03
Democratic	John Calhoun (incumbent)	1,266	8.26
Democratic	Jesse B. Thomas, Jr.	1,241	8.10
Democratic	James W. Barrett	1,211	7.90
Democratic	John Cooper	1,175	7.67
Democratic	Moses K. Anderson	1,174	7.66
Total votes		15,325	100.0

== United States House of Representatives ==
1842: Despite aspirations for the congressional office, Lincoln did not actively run for the Whig Party nomination; as a delegate to the Whig nominating convention, Lincoln helped cut a deal that would give John J. Hardin the nomination in 1842, Edward Dickinson Baker the nomination in 1844 and Lincoln the nomination in 1846.

=== 1846 elections ===
Illinois's 7th congressional district general election, 1846
Party	Candidate	Votes	%
Whig	Abraham Lincoln	6,340	55.53
Democratic	Peter Cartwright	4,829	42.29
Liberty	Elihu Walcott	249	2.18
Total votes		11,418	100.0
Whig hold			

== Illinois House of Representatives ==
1854 - Wins seat in Illinois House of Representatives. Declines serving in that seat in order to be eligible for his immediate candidacy for United States Senate. The election was held in November 1854, for a term starting in January 1855.

== 1855 US Senate election ==
The election was held on February 8, 1855, for a term starting in March 1855.

Note: At this time, U.S. Senators were elected by the state legislatures, not by vote of the people

Candidate	Round 1	Round 2	Round 3	Round 4	Round 5	Round 6	Round 7	Round 8	Round 9	Round 10
James Shields, Democrat	41	41	41	41	42	41	1	0	0	0
Abraham Lincoln, Whig	45	44	41	38	34	36	38	27	15	0
Lyman Trumbull, Democrat	5	6	6	11	10	8	9	18	35	51
William B. Ogden, Democrat	1	0	0	1	5	5	4	6	0	0
Joel A. Matteson, Democrat	1	1	0	2	1	0	44	46	47	47
William Kellogg	1	0	0	0	0	0	0	0	0	0
Gustavus Koerner	2	2	2	2	2	2	1	1	0	0
Cyrus Edwards	1	0	0	0	0	0	0	0	0	0
Orlando B. Ficklin, Democrat	1	1	0	0	0	0	0	0	0	0
William A. Denning	1	1	3	1	1	0	0	0	0	0
Martin P. Sweet	0	2	3	1	0	0	0	0	0	0
Archibald Williams, Whig	0	2	2	1	0	0	0	0	1	1
J. Young Scammon, Whig	0	0	0	0	1	0	0	0	0	0
Orville H. Browning, Whig	0	0	0	0	2	3	0	0	0	0
John A. Logan, Democrat	0	0	0	0	0	3	0	0	0	0
John A. McClernand, Democrat	0	0	0	8	0	0	1	0	0	0

51 votes needed for election

Candidate won that Round of voting
Candidate won Senate seat

Note: Five "anti-Nebraska" Democrats (i.e. opposed to the Kansas–Nebraska Act) voted for Trumbull rather than vote for Lincoln, a Whig. When pro-Nebraska Democrats were unable to reelect Shields, they switched their allegiance to Matteson, who had no stance on the Act. Lincoln then withdrew and threw his support to Trumbull, so that an anti-Nebraska candidate would be assured victory.

== 1856 presidential election ==
=== Vice presidential nomination for the Republican Party ===
- William Lewis Dayton: 523 (64.73%)
- Abraham Lincoln: 110 (13.61%)
- Nathaniel Prentice Banks: 46 (5.69%)
- David Wilmot: 43 (5.32%)
- Charles Sumner: 35 (4.33%)
- Jacob Collamer: 15 (1.86%)
- John Alsop King: 9 (1.11%)
- Samuel C. Pomeroy: 8 (0.99%)
- Thomas Ford: 7 (0.87%)
- Henry Charles Carey: 3 (0.37%)
- Cassius M. Clay: 3 (0.37%)
- Joshua R. Giddings: 2 (0.25%)
- Whitfield Johnson: 2 (0.25%)
- Aaron Pennington: 1 (0.12%)
- Henry Wilson: 1 (0.12%)
- Wyatt Gauger: 1 (0.12%)

== 1858 US Senate election ==
Note: At this time, U.S. Senators were elected by the state legislatures, not by vote of the people

United States Senate election in Illinois, 1858
Party	Candidate	Votes	%	±%
Democratic	Stephen A. Douglas (inc.)	54	54.00	
Republican	Abraham Lincoln	46	46.00	
Majority		8	8.00	
Democratic hold				

== 1860 presidential election ==
=== Republican Party nomination ===
Presidential ballot
Nominee	Home State	1st	2nd	3rd	3rd "corrected"
William H. Seward	New York	173.5	184.5	180	111.5
Abraham Lincoln	Illinois	102	181	231.5	349
Simon Cameron	Pennsylvania	50.5	2	0	0
Salmon P. Chase	Ohio	49	42.5	24.5	2
Edward Bates	Missouri	48	35	22	0
William L. Dayton	New Jersey	14	10	1	1
John McLean	Ohio	12	8	5	0.5
Jacob Collamer	Vermont	10	0	-	-
Benjamin F. Wade	Ohio	3	0	-	-
John M. Read	Pennsylvania	1	0	-	-
Charles Sumner	Massachusetts	1	0	-	-
John C. Fremont	California	1	0	-	-
Cassius M. Clay	Kentucky	-	2	1	1

Upon seeing how close Lincoln was to the 233 votes needed after the third ballot, a delegate from Ohio switched 4 votes from Chase to Lincoln. This triggered an avalanche towards Lincoln with a final count of 364 votes out of 466 cast.

=== General election ===
Electoral results
Presidential candidate	Party	Home state	Popular vote^{(a)}		Electoral vote	Running mate		
Presidential candidate	Party	Home state	Count	Percentage	Electoral vote	Vice-presidential candidate	Home state	Electoral vote
Abraham Lincoln	Republican	Illinois	1,865,908	39.8%	180	Hannibal Hamlin	Maine	180
John C. Breckinridge	Southern Democratic	Kentucky	848,019	18.1%	72	Joseph Lane	Oregon	72
John Bell	Constitutional Union/Whig	Tennessee	590,901	12.6%	39	Edward Everett	Massachusetts	39
Stephen A. Douglas	Northern Democratic	Illinois	1,380,202	29.5%	12	Herschel Vespasian Johnson	Georgia	12
Other			531	0.0%	—	Other		—
Total			4,685,561	100%	303			303
Needed to win					152			152

Source (Popular Vote): Leip, David. "1860 Presidential Election Results". Dave Leip's Atlas of U.S. Presidential Elections.
Source (Electoral Vote): "Electoral College Box Scores 1789–1996". National Archives and Records Administration.

^{(a)} The popular vote figures exclude South Carolina where the Electors were chosen by the state legislature rather than by popular vote.

== 1864 presidential election ==
=== Republican Party nomination ===
Presidential ballot
Ballot	1st before shifts	1st after shifts
Abraham Lincoln	484	506
Ulysses S. Grant	22	0

=== General election ===
Electoral results
Presidential candidate	Party	Home state	Popular vote^{(a)}		Electoral vote^{(a), (b)}	Running mate		
Presidential candidate	Party	Home state	Count	Percentage	Electoral vote^{(a), (b)}	Vice-presidential candidate	Home state	Electoral vote^{(a), (b)}
Abraham Lincoln	National Union^{(c)}	Illinois	2,218,388	55.0%	212	Andrew Johnson^{(c)}	Tennessee	212
George Brinton McClellan	Democratic	New Jersey	1,812,807	45.0%	21	George Hunt Pendleton	Ohio	21
Other			692	0.0%	—	Other		—
Total			4,031,887	100%	233			233
Needed to win					117			117

Source (Popular Vote): Leip, David. "1864 Presidential Election Results". Dave Leip's Atlas of U.S. Presidential Elections.
Source (Electoral Vote): "Electoral College Box Scores 1789–1996". National Archives and Records Administration. ^{(a)} The states in rebellion did not participate in the election of 1864.
^{(b)} One Elector from Nevada did not vote
^{(c)} Andrew Johnson had been a Democrat, and after 1869 was a Democrat. The Republican Party called itself the National Union Party to accommodate the War Democrats in this election.

== See also ==
- Lincoln and Liberty, Lincoln's 1860 campaign song
