= Andrew Donnally Sr =

Andrew Donnally Sr (1738–1796) was a Colonel and Sheriff in the Greenbrier County Militia during the French and Indian War through the American Revolution. In 1771, Donnally erected Fort Donnally in Greenbrier County, where he was also appointed as high sheriff.

Donnally owned many slaves, including Dick Pointer, who was regarded to be a fierce warrior in the defense of Fort Donnally in 1778. Dick's son however, fled and became an Indian chief who sided with the Americans in the war of 1812.

On January 29, 1781, Colonel Donnally sends a letter co-signed by Colonel Andrew Hamilton, and Samuel Brown in response to Colonel Clark's request to draft 137 men for Clark's “Expedition against the Indians in Consequence”. Donnally explains to Jefferson the dire needs and dangers in the region by furnishing more men when the violence against Indian attacks are increasing. This expedition event would later be known as Lochry's Defeat.

On April 14, 1781, received a letter from Thomas Jefferson expressing his sorrow for Indian hostilities in the region and that Jefferson informed General Clark that he will appoint a Deputy to the region to assist.

In 1782, Donnally was named as one of the trustees for the newly established town of Lewisburg, alongside Samuel Lewis (son of General Andrew Lewis), and James Reed.

In 1789, Donnally was made a trustee of the town of Charleston in the newly established Kanawha County along with Leonard Morris, William Morris, George Alderson, Abraham Baker, John Young and William Clendenin.

Donnally, had a son, Andrew Donnally Jr, who married Marjory Van Bibber, the daughter of Captain John Van Bibber. Donnally's daughter married Jesse Boone, the son of Daniel Boone.
