= KBXI =

Radio station in Park City–Billings, Montana

- Park City, Montana; United States
- Broadcast area: Billings Metropolitan Area
- Frequency: 92.5 MHz
- Branding: Mojo 92.5

Programming
- Format: Adult hits

Ownership
- Owner: Kurtis Anthony Breunig; (Anthony Media Inc.)
- Sister stations: KRPM

History
- First air date: 2006 (as KWMY)
- Former call signs: KPCQ-FM (1982–1984); KLZY (1984–2006); KWMY (2006–2009)

Technical information
- Licensing authority: FCC
- Facility ID: 10336
- Class: C1
- ERP: 100,000 watts
- HAAT: 189 meters (620 ft)
- Transmitter coordinates: 45°45′54″N 108°27′19″W

Links
- Public license information: Public file; LMS
- Webcast: Listen Live
- Website: mojo925.com

KBXI (92.5 FM, "Mojo 92.5") is a commercial radio station licensed in Park City, Montana, broadcasting to the Billings, Montana, area. KBXI airs a variety hits music format. Licensed to Park City, Montana, United States, the station serves the Billings area. The station is currently owned by local radio personality Kurt Anthony, through licensee Anthony Media Inc. Anthony also operates Twang 107.5.

The station features classic rock, adult hits, & pop music hybrid format with a twist, featuring a variety of local live on-air radio hosts.

The list include the following well-known Billings radio personalities: Kurt Anthony, Charlie Fox, Rockin' Rob, and Major Dan (Mojo) Miller.
