= Dick Pointer =

Dick Pointer (before 1778 – 1827) was an American frontier hero and an enslaved African. He is best known for his bravery in the defence of Fort Donnally, in Greenbrier County, West Virginia, from a Shawnee attack in 1778. During the attack, he used a rifle to secure the front door against attackers. Some years later, Pointer spoke before the Virginia General Assembly, requesting his freedom in consideration for his act of bravery; he was emancipated in 1801. He died in 1827.

== See also ==
- Phillip Hamman

== Notes ==
- Clauson-Wicker, Su; Rockefeller, Jay (2009). Off the Beaten Path: West Virginia (7th ed.). Globe Pequot Press. ISBN 9780762753345.
- https://wvexplorer.com/2019/09/22/dick-pointer-grave-lewisburg-west-virginia-wv-slave/
- https://www.wvencyclopedia.org/articles/1891
- https://www.wvpublic.org/post/may-29-1778-dick-pointer-black-slave-helps-save-some-60-settlers-greenbrier-valley-0#stream/0
