= Otto Marmet =

- Theodor Friedrich Heinrich Carl Ludwig Maria Otto Marmett
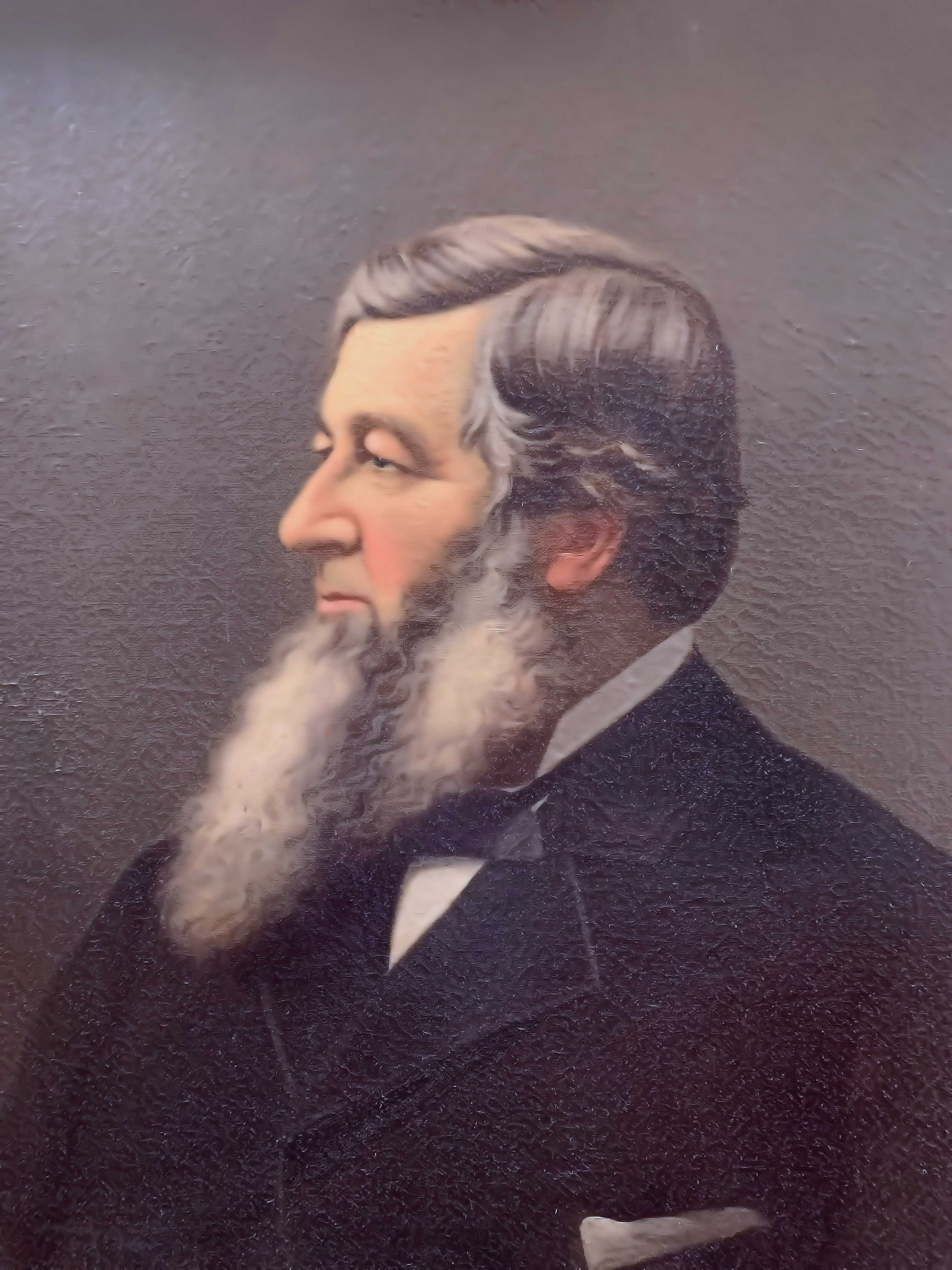
- Born: June 25, 1828; Hamm, Germany
- Died: October 3, 1899 (aged 71); Cincinnati, Ohio, US
- Resting place: Springe Grove Cemetery, Cincinnati
- Other name: Marmet
- Spouse: Sarah J. Bogen
- Children: 2

Otto Marmet (June 27, 1826 in Hamm, Germany – October 3, 1899 in Cincinnati, Ohio) was a German-American immigrant known for his contributions to business and industry in the United States during the 19th century. He was the son of Dr. William F. Marmett and Clara Niehaus Marmett.

== Early life ==
Otto Marmet was born in Hamm, Westphalia in the Kingdom of Prussia on June 27, 1826, but he later immigrated to the United States with his parents and 9 siblings.

== Career ==
Marmet was actively involved in business and industrial ventures, particularly in the coal and mining sectors. His name became associated with the Otto-Marmet Coal & Mining Company, The Marmet-Halm Coal & Coke Company, and the Marmet-Smith Coal Company which operated in West Virginia and played a role in the development of the region’s coal industry. His company were the sole distributors of the Raymond City Splint Coal.

In addition to his business endeavors, a steam towboat named Otto Marmet was constructed in 1898 at Raymond City, West Virginia. The vessel operated on the Ohio River and was in service until it was destroyed by fire at North Bend, Ohio in 1935.

== Death and legacy ==
He died in 1899 while in Ohio, leaving his two daughters and his wife, who lived together at the Hotel Alms in Cincinnati, Ohio.

Marmet, West Virginia, was named after him and his company.
