= United Methodist Episcopal Church =

Historic church in Montana, United States

- United Methodist Episcopal
- U.S. National Register of Historic Places
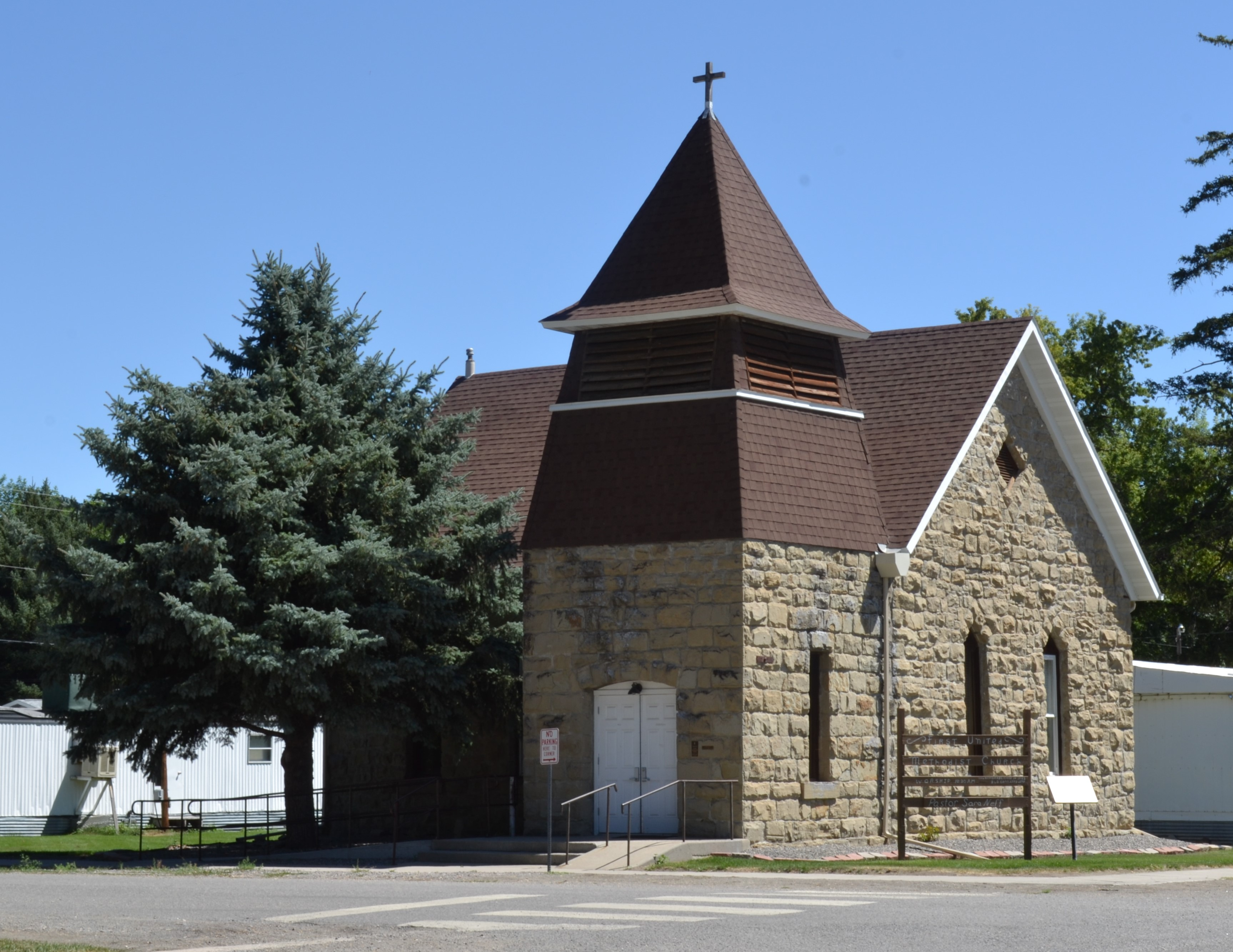

- Location within Montana Location within the United States
- Location: Southeast corner of Clark St. and Second Ave., Park City, Montana
- Coordinates: 45°37′50″N 108°54′54″W
- Area: less than one acre
- Built: 1898
- NRHP reference No.: 10000497
- Added to NRHP: July 26, 2010

The United Methodist Episcopal Church in Park City, Montana, also known as Park City Methodist Episcopal Church and as First United Methodist Church, is a historic church built in 1898 that was listed on the National Register of Historic Places in 2010.

According to its NRHP nomination it is "a simple yet stately sandstone church building". It was built by stonemason Manley Downs.
