= Morris' Company of Rangers =

Capt Morris' Company of Rangers
- Morris Rangers
- Active: October 6, 1789 - January 1, 1793
- Disbanded: January 1, 1793
- Allegiance: United States
- Branch: Virginia Militia; U.S. Army
- Type: Guerilla; Surveillance
- Size: Company
- Garrison/HQ: Fort Morris, Kanawha County, Virginia
- Engagements: Whiskey Rebellion; Northwest Indian Wars

Commanders
- Captain: John Morris
- Lieutenant: John Young
- Lieutenant: George Shaw
- Ensign: Andrew Lewis
- Ensign: Alexander Clendenin
- Sergeant: William Morris

Morris' Company of Rangers (1789-1793) also referred to as the "Kanawha County Rangers" was a Ranger Company out of the newly established Kanawha County in 1789. From March to July 1789 the Kanawha County Rangers were under the command of Colonel George Clendenin until Clendenin was named as commander of the county militia by the Governor of Virginia.

In a letter from Kanawha County Lieutenant George Clendenin dated May 6, 1789 to President George Washington, delivered by Beverley Randolph, Clendenin states that due to growing hostilities he deployed his company of Rangers and Scouts to hunt for the hostile Indians who recently killed four settlers.

Captain John Morris assumed command of the unit where it became known as "Morris' Company of Ranger". The unit was called into federal service twice by the Secretary of War, General Henry Knox from May 1, 1791 until January 1, 1793 to fight and provide defense in the aftermath days of the American Revolution during the ratification process of the United States Bill of Rights, as well as the quelling Whiskey Rebellion and Indian Wars.

== Indian Wars ==
During the Indian Wars, the Morris' Company of Rangers engaged in surveillance, and guerilla warfare against the Northwestern Confederacy tribes. The criteria to be a spy was: "must be composed of the inhabitance who Well Know the Woods and waters from the pint to Belville." The garrison, Fort Morris, was later known as Kelly's Post in the Kanawha Valley. On January 1, 1793 the unit had 97 soldiers in the Company.

On December 22, 1792 the Virginia Militia reorganized all of the units in the newly established Virginia Counties and formed the 13th Brigade, Virginia Militia. In 1889 the State of West Virginia reorganized the State militia Brigade to become 2nd Regiment, West Virginia National Guard due to western-Virginia breaking off and becoming the state of West Virginia. The state was unable to reorganize officially due to the Civil War and aftermath thereof. In 1899, the Regiment was renamed the 2nd Infantry Regiment, West Virginia National Guard; and in 1917, it became the 150th Infantry Regiment, and in 2005 it underwent a new classification as the 150th Cavalry Regiment.

== Company Commander ==
The Rangers were part of the Virginia Militia under the command of Captain John Morris (December 17, 1755 - September 22, 1818). Captain Morris was an experienced officer, soldier, and experienced pioneer who understood the Indian movements in the area. Morris served in Lord Dunmore's War in 1774 under then Colonel Andrew Lewis, and during the entirety of American Revolution. Captain Morris served with General George Rogers Clark in his expedition in 1778-1779 in the Illinois Campaign. Morris and Clark were separated by three years in age, and both were veterans of the Battle of Point Pleasant in 1774.

After the war, in 1789, the Governor of Virginia, Beverley Randolph, authorized the creation of the new Ranger Company, Morris' Company of Rangers, to combat growing hostilities between the settlers in Kanawha County and the Indian Confederacy. Captain John Morris was selected by the committee to be the unit commander. He is the father of US Congressman Calvary Morris, and Bishop Thomas Asbury Morris. Morris's brothers Leonard Morris, and Henry Morris also served in the unit.

== Federal Service ==
From May 1, 1791 until September 30, 1791 the Ranger Company was federally called to service in support of the Whiskey Rebellion. The Rangers garrison was at Fort Morris, although much of the Company was stationed at Colonel George Clendenin's Station, Lt. John Young was one of the officers who was assigned to the Station. Soldiers received assignments to guard and protect large farms of several prominent families including that of William Morris, Leonard Morris, William Morris Jr., Henry Morris, Colonel George Clendenin, Colonel Andrew Donnelly, Joseph Carroll, John Jones, and Allyn Pryor from hostile Indian attacks that became more prevalent during the Whiskey Rebellion. The unit had some brushes against local Indian tribes, but no casualties.

From March 15, 1792 until January 1, 1793 Captain John Morris' Company of Rangers were called again to federal service in support of Northwest Indian Wars

The unit ended federal service on January 1, 1793, the official disband date of the unit is unknown.
