= Park City, Montana =

- CDP
- Location of Park City, Montana
- Coordinates: 45°37′38″N 108°55′43″W
- Country: United States
- State: Montana
- County: Stillwater

Area
  - Total: 1.58 sq mi (4.08 km^{2})
  - Land: 1.58 sq mi (4.08 km^{2})
  - Water: 0 sq mi (0.00 km^{2})
- Elevation: 3,412 ft (1,040 m)

Population (2020)
  - Total: 1,023
  - Density: 649.9/sq mi (250.93/km^{2})
- Time zone: UTC-7 (Mountain (MST))
  - Summer (DST): UTC-6 (MDT)
- ZIP code: 59063
- Area code: 406
- FIPS code: 30-56575
- GNIS feature ID: 2409026

Park City is a census-designated place (CDP) in Stillwater County, Montana, United States. The population was 1,023 at the 2020 census.

Located 20 miles from the state's largest city, Billings, Park City has a small town atmosphere. It is not incorporated, therefore does not have a mayor or any other "city" legislative positions. The town serves as a bedroom community for the neighboring cities of Laurel and Billings. Most inhabitants are employed in either of those two towns. It is mainly a farming community, growing mostly sugar beets and corn.

The town has a library, school, fire department, two gas stations/convenience stores, three churches of different denominations as well as two bars. Most of the historical buildings are made of sandstone, due to the large sandstone cliffs to the north of the town.

A post office was opened under the name Young’s Point in 1878. In 1882 a group of settler's arrived and named the area Park City.

== Geography ==
According to the United States Census Bureau, the CDP has a total area of 1.0 square mile (2.6 km^{2}), all land.

The Yellowstone River is south of town.

=== Climate ===
According to the Köppen Climate Classification system, Park City has a semi-arid climate, abbreviated "BSk" on climate maps.

== Demographics ==
Historical population
Census	Pop.	Note	%±
2020	1,023		—
U.S. Decennial Census

As of the census of 2000, there were 870 people, 330 households, and 256 families residing in the CDP. The population density was 838.9 inhabitants per square mile (323.9/km^{2}). There were 343 housing units at an average density of 330.7 per square mile (127.7/km^{2}). The racial makeup of the CDP was 96.78% White, 0.23% African American, 0.57% Native American, 0.11% Asian, 1.03% from other races, and 1.26% from two or more races. Hispanic or Latino of any race were 1.15% of the population.

There were 330 households, out of which 38.2% had children under the age of 18 living with them, 67.3% were married couples living together, 7.0% had a female householder with no husband present, and 22.4% were non-families. 20.3% of all households were made up of individuals, and 9.7% had someone living alone who was 65 years of age or older. The average household size was 2.64 and the average family size was 3.05.

In the CDP, the population was spread out, with 27.4% under the age of 18, 7.5% from 18 to 24, 27.1% from 25 to 44, 27.5% from 45 to 64, and 10.6% who were 65 years of age or older. The median age was 37 years. For every 100 females, there were 95.1 males. For every 100 females age 18 and over, there were 93.9 males.

The median income for a household in the CDP was $37,266, and the median income for a family was $42,917. Males had a median income of $31,806 versus $16,490 for females. The per capita income for the CDP was $16,912. About 5.1% of families and 8.7% of the population were below the poverty line, including 15.3% of those under age 18 and 7.5% of those age 65 or over.

== Education ==
The largest building in the city is Park City Schools. It educates students from kindergarten through 12th grade. In the 2023-2024 school year, the school had 218 students from kindergarten to 8th grade and the high school had 96 students.

Park City High School's team name is the Panthers with colors of red and black.

== Media ==
Two radio stations are licensed in Park City. KBIL primarily broadcasts contemporary worship music. KBXI airs a variety hits music format.

== Infrastructure ==
Interstate 90 passes on the north of town from east to west.

The nearest airport is Billings Logan International Airport. Healthcare is available in Billings, Columbus, or Laurel.
