= Fort Donnally, West Virginia =

Unincorporated community in West Virginia, United States

- Unincorporated community
- Location within West Virginia Location within the United States
- Coordinates: 37°56′37″N 80°28′33″W
- Country: United States
- State: West Virginia
- County: Greenbrier
- Elevation: 2,205 ft (672 m)
- Time zone: UTC-5 (Eastern (EST))
  - Summer (DST): UTC-4 (EDT)
- Area codes: 304 & 681
- GNIS feature ID: 1556430

Fort Donnally is an unincorporated community in Greenbrier County, West Virginia, United States. It is located along Rader Run Road in Rader Valley, just off US 60, approximately 8 miles (13 km) west of Lewisburg. It is also about 7.5 miles (12.1 km) southwest of Falling Spring.

== History ==
The frontier fort that became the settlement was built in 1767 by Andrew Donnally Sr.

Fort Donnally was the site of an attack by a large group of Indians in May 1778. The settlements were warned by two scouts from Point Pleasant named John Pryor and Philip Hammond (Hamman) who had volunteered to give warning to the Greenbriar settlements. The two scouts went from Point Pleasant to Fort Donnally on foot, being dressed to look like Indians by Nonhelema, the sister of Chief Cornstalk. Col. John Stuart came to the aid of the Fort the next day after the attack had begun, news of the attack having arrived by messenger to Lewisburg, then Fort Savannah.
