= Edmund Dick Taylor =

American politician and businessman (1804–1891)

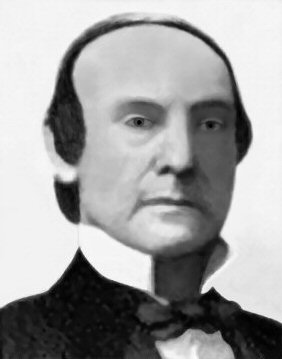
- "Father of the Greenback"

U.S. Receiver of Public Moneys at Chicago
- In office 1835–1839
- Preceded by: None
- Succeeded by: Eli S. Prescott

Member of the Illinois State Senate
- In office 1834–1835
- Succeeded by: Job Fletcher

Member of the Illinois House of Representatives
- In office 1832–1834; 1830–1832

Personal details
- Born: October 18, 1804 Lunenburg County, Virginia
- Died: December 4, 1891 (aged 87) Chicago, Illinois
- Resting place: Oak Ridge Cemetery
- Party: Democratic
- Spouse: Margaret Taylor
- Children: John Taylor, Charles Taylor, William W. Taylor, Elizabeth J. Taylor, Ella F. Taylor, Margaret Taylor, and others.
- Occupation: Entrepreneur

Military service
- Branch/service: United States, Illinois Militia
- Battles/wars: Black Hawk War; Winnebago War

Colonel Edmund Dick Taylor (October 18, 1804 – December 4, 1891) was an American businessman, politician, and soldier from Illinois. He is remembered as the first person to suggest that the United States should issue paper currency ("greenbacks") during the American Civil War.

== Early life ==
He was born Edmund Richard Taylor in Lunenburg County, Virginia, son of Giles Y Taylor (1766–1830) and Francine "Sina" Stokes. (Another account says that he was born at Fairfield Courthouse, Pennsylvania.) In later years, he preferred to use his middle name rather than his first name, and used in its short form. Thus he became known as "Dick" Taylor, and his middle initial was written "D" in formal documents.

According to his obituary, Taylor "came to Illinois in 1811, settling in Shawneetown on the Ohio river. Although but a child then he had only himself to depend on, and at the age of 16 loaded a flat boat with salt and provisions and floated down the river into Arkansas, there to trade his salt to the Indians for furs. After selling out he traded the flatboat for ponies and packed his pelts back to Shawneetown on their backs." In the fall of 1823, he began general merchandising with Colonel John Taylor in Springfield, Illinois. On 18 September 1829, he married Margaret Taylor (born 28 December 1813 in Kentucky), the daughter of Col. John Taylor and Elizabeth (Burkhead) Taylor.

== Politics ==
In 1830, he was elected to the Illinois State Legislature, representing Sangamon County. In 1832 he was re-elected, defeating several challengers including Abraham Lincoln. Taylor and Achilles Morris were the only men to defeat Lincoln in a direct election. In 1834 he was elected to the Illinois Senate from Sangamon County. Another one of his opponents was Methodist circuit preacher Peter Cartwright, "who, in one stump speeches, called Taylor a beardless youth. Taylor's response was that, though he might be a beardless youth, he would move the capital from old Vandalia to Springfield if he was elected. He was elected, and proved that his promise was not an idle one."

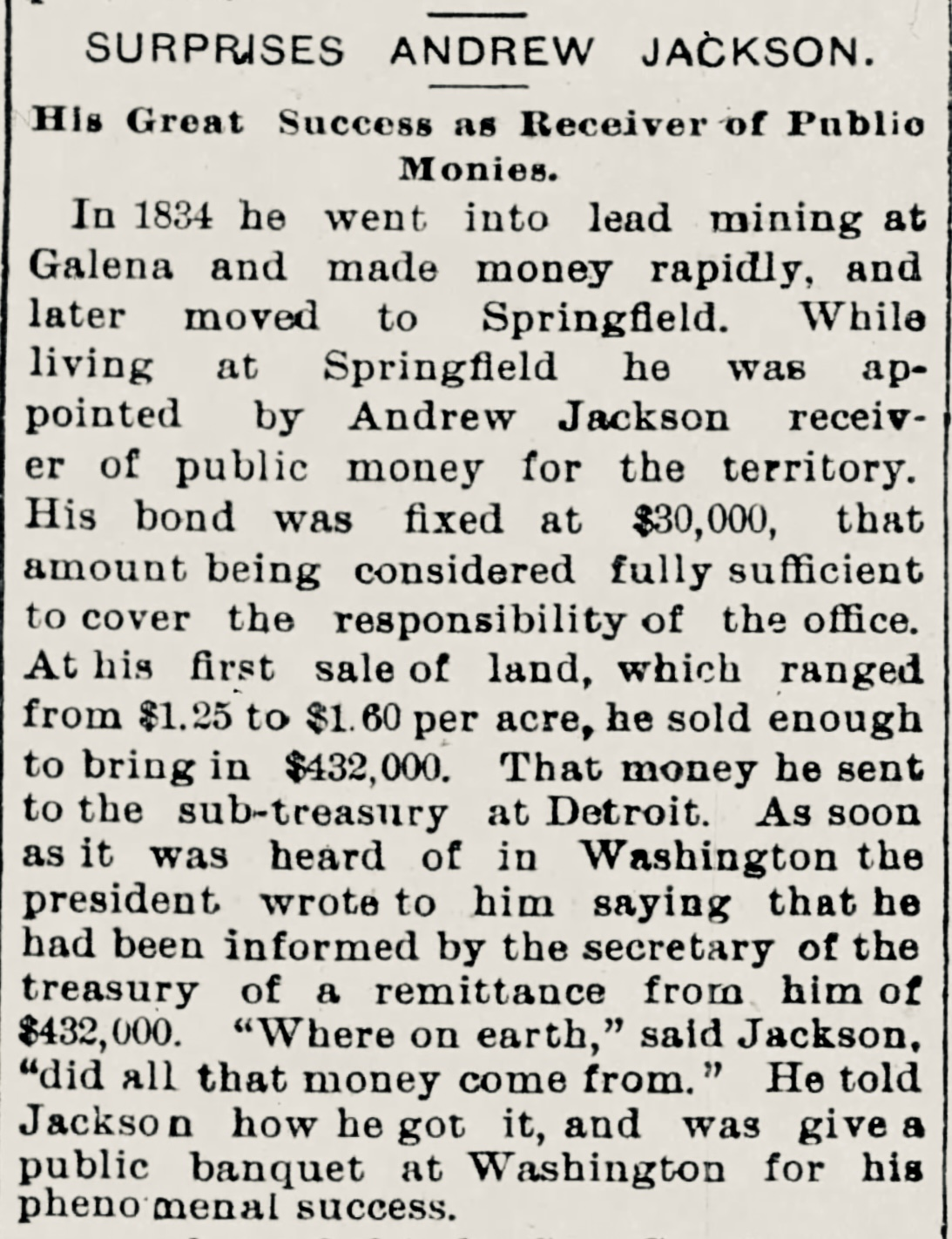
Quote from "Lincoln's Friend – Col. E. D. Taylor, of Chicago, Sleeps in Death – End of a Very Notable Career" (1891)

In 1835, he was appointed by President Andrew Jackson as Receiver of Public Moneys in Chicago, where he was in charge of substantial sales of federal land. After holding this position for four years, he returned to the private sector. He continued to play a leading role in Democratic Party politics in Illinois.

== Business career ==
=== Illinois coal mines ===
Taylor was a pioneer of the coal industry in Illinois. In 1823 he took an interest in coal and opened the West End Shaft, also known as West End Coal Mine. He had a lead mine at Galena.

In 1856, he sank a shaft in LaSalle County, Illinois, operating as the Northern Illinois Coal and Iron Company. He also owned other mines in that area.

On 18 February 1863, at a convention in Chicago of the coal operators in Illinois, Edmund was appointed Chairman.

=== Internal improvements ===
Taylor played an important role in Illinois in promoting and bringing about "internal improvements" (canals, railroads, and other transportation infrastructure). General Usher F. Linder stated "If any man deserves more credit than another for the completion of the Illinois and Michigan Canal, it is Col. Edmund D. Taylor."

When the Galena and Chicago Union Railroad was incorporated on 16 January 1836, Taylor was appointed commissioner and director.

On 18 January 1837, at Russell's Saloon in Chicago, supporters of internal improvements held a mass meeting. William H. Brown was called to the chair and William Stuart appointed Secretary, Francis Payton stated the objects of the meeting. A committee of five was appointed namely: Edmund D. Taylor, Captain J. B. F. Russell, Francis Payton, John H. Kinzie, and Joseph N. Balestier. The meeting declared in favor of the immediate construction of the Illinois Central Railroad and general system of improvement.

=== Chicago Merchants' Exchange ===
On 5 February 1857, the Chicago Merchants' Exchange company was incorporated by: Edmund D. Taylor, Thomas Hall, George Armour, James Peck, John P. Chapin, Walter S. Gurnee, Edward Kendall Rogers, Thomas Richmond, Julian Sidney Rumsey, Samuel B. Pomeroy, Elisha Wadsworth, Walter Loomis Newberry, Hiram Wheeler and George Steele.

=== Bankruptcy ===
Taylor was ruined by the Great Chicago Fire of 1871, which destroyed 14 stores owned by him. He had insurance, but it was with Chicago firms that were overwhelmed by the disaster.

=== Appeal to Congress ===
During the Civil War, Taylor had spent considerable sums from his own pocket for travel on government business and in raising and equipping Union troops. At the time, he asked for no reimbursement. But in 1887, he applied to Congress to be repaid $15,000 of his expenses. Taylor retained considerable standing in Chicago's business community. His petition included a supporting memorial signed by 56 prominent men of Chicago and Illinois. Taylor's petition was considered by the Committee on War Claims, but it was rejected for want of documentation. Taylor renewed his petition in 1890, but it was again rejected.

== Father of the Greenback ==
By late 1861, it was clear that the Civil War was going to be much more costly than anyone had expected, and that the Union would have to raise or find or borrow vast amounts of money. Taylor had the idea that the Union could pay its expenses with newly created money in the form of paper currency ("greenbacks"). In 1861, Taylor mentioned his idea for greenbacks at General Grant's headquarters in Cairo, Illinois.

On 16 January 1862, Taylor met privately with President Abraham Lincoln at his request. Taylor suggested the issuance of treasury notes bearing no interest and printed on the best banking paper. Taylor said "Just get Congress to pass a bill authorizing the printing of full legal tender treasury notes... and pay your soldiers with them and go ahead and win your war with them also. If you make them full legal tender... they will have the full sanction of the government and be just as good as any money; as Congress is given the express right by the Constitution."

In a letter dated 16 December 1864, the President named Col. Edmund D. Taylor as "the father of the present greenback".

Taylor cited his suggestion of the greenback in his 1887 petition to Congress. He included the 1864 letter from Lincoln. In February 1888, he added a recent letter from General John McClernand, who had been at Cairo at the time, and confirmed Taylor's account.

== Educational institutions ==
Taylor was a patron of many educational institutions.

In 1837, he was on the Board of Trustees for Rush Medical College.

In 1857, he was one of the Founding Board of Trustees for the Old University of Chicago.

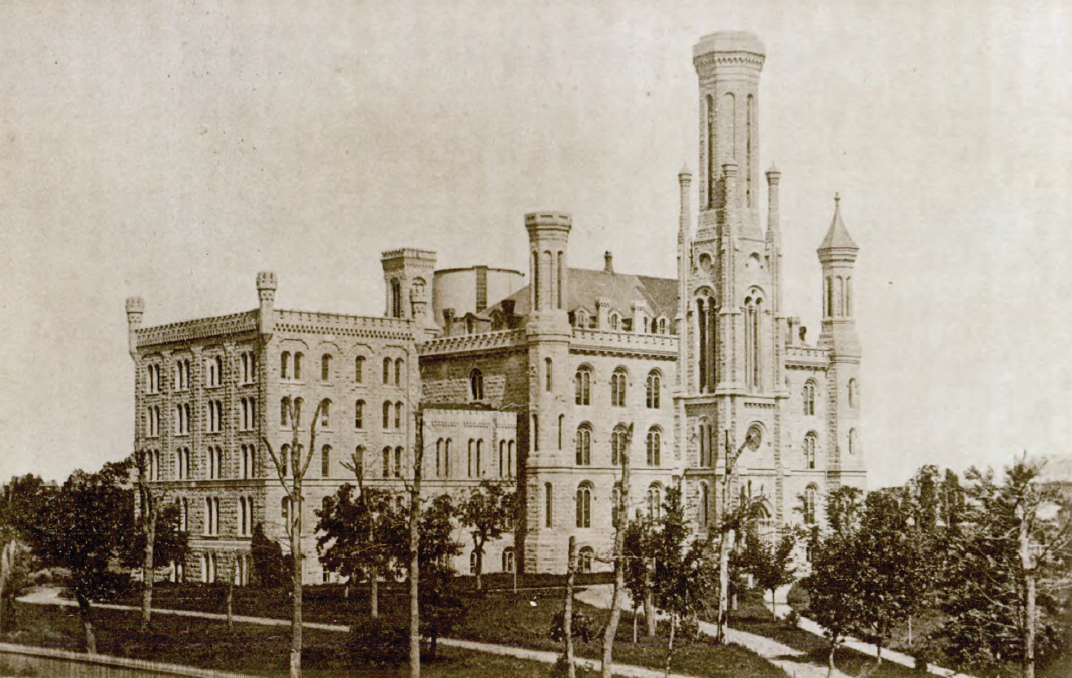
The Old University of Chicago

== Military service ==
Taylor had several tours of military service.

During the Winnebago War of 1827, he enlisted as a private in Captain Bowling Green's Company of the militia on 20 July 1827, and was honorably discharged 27 August.

During the Black Hawk War of 1831, he was commissioned as a colonel in the state militia on 13 June by governor John Reynolds. He was also Aide-de-camp to Brigadier General Joseph Duncan of the Brigade of Mounted Volunteers, in service of the United States.

During the Civil War, Taylor was again commissioned a colonel. He did not serve in the field, but was employed very extensively by President Lincoln as a confidential messenger.

== Family ==
On 18 September 1829 in Illinois, Edmund Richard "Dick" Taylor married Margaret Taylor (b. 28 December 1813 in Kentucky), the daughter of his business partner Col. John Taylor and Elizabeth Burkhead. Their offspring were:

- Giles Y Taylor (1833–1852) married. His son Giles Young Taylor married 16 March 1886 in Dupage County, Illinois, to Ella May Downing;
- Elizabeth Taylor (1834–1915);
- Hannah T Taylor (b. 1836);
- Samuel F Taylor (1836–1876);
- Margaret A Taylor (25 Nov 1838 in Cook County, Illinois – 9 Feb 1922), married B. F. Beebe;
- John Taylor (b. 1843 in Illinois);
- Charles T. Taylor (17 October 1844 in Springfield, Illinois – 3 August 1905), industrialist, married Pelagie Ewing (18 November 1846 – 28 December 1920), sister of William L. Ewing;
- Dick Taylor (b. 1846 in Indiana);
- William W Taylor (1853–1911), General Superintendent of St. Paul Coal Company, married in Illinois to Jennie Margaret Mills (25 Nov 1853 in La Salle County, Illinois – 25 April 1936); and
- Ella Francine Taylor (1857–1938), married 6 November 1878 in La Salle County, Illinois, to Isaac Whitson Rogers.

He was a first cousin of Zachary Taylor.

== Death ==
Taylor died in Chicago, Illinois, on December 4, 1891.
