= Marmet, West Virginia =

City in West Virginia, US

Town of Marmet
- Town
- Seal

- Location of Marmet in Kanawha County, West Virginia.
- Coordinates: 38°14′43″N 81°34′3″W
- Country: United States
- State: West Virginia
- County: Kanawha
- Incorporated: 1921

Government
  - Mayor: Frances Armentrout

Area
  - Total: 1.41 sq mi (3.65 km^{2})
  - Land: 1.27 sq mi (3.30 km^{2})
  - Water: 0.14 sq mi (0.35 km^{2})
- Elevation: 610 ft (186 m)

Population (2020)
  - Total: 1,501
  - Estimate (2021): 1,473
  - Density: 1,072.6/sq mi (414.13/km^{2})
- Time zone: UTC-5 (Eastern (EST))
  - Summer (DST): UTC-4 (EDT)
- ZIP codes: 25315, 25365
- Area code(s): 304 & 681
- FIPS code: 54-51724
- GNIS feature ID: 1542771
- Website: townofmarmetwv.com

Marmet (pronounced mar-MET) is a town in Kanawha County, West Virginia, United States, along the Kanawha River. The population was 1,501 at the 2020 census.

== History ==
Marmet was originally named Elizaville after the wife of Leonard Morris, who first settled here in 1773 and founded the town in 1780. The town's name was known variously as Browntown, Brownstown, and Brownsville, after Charles Brown, who was engaged in the Kanawha saltworks business. The town's name was again changed to Marmet after the Marmet Coal Company, owned by Edwin, Otto, and William Marmet, which developed large tracts of coal lands around Marmet in 1899. The post office at Marmet was discontinued on October 20, 1961, and its mail was routed through nearby Charleston.

=== Battle of Blair Mountain ===
In August 1921, thousands of pro-union coal miners organized in Marmet and marched 60 miles to Mingo County through Boone County and then into Logan before entering into Mingo. The aim was an attempt to free striking miners who had been arrested after the governor declared martial law. This confrontation between armed miners’ and the coal companies' army constituted the largest pitched battle in the history of the labor movement in the United States and became the largest insurrection on U.S. soil since the American Civil War. The battle only ended after President Harding called in the army to suppress the uprising. Once the military intervened, the miners laid down their weapons and the fighting ended.

== Geography ==
Marmet is located at 38°14′43″N 81°34′3″W (38.245148, -81.567510).

According to the United States Census Bureau, the town has a total area of 1.41 square miles (3.65 km^{2}), of which 1.27 square miles (3.29 km^{2}) is land and 0.14 square miles (0.36 km^{2}) is water.

== Demographics ==
Historical population
Census	Pop.	Note	%±
1930	1,200		—
1940	1,814		51.2%
1950	2,515		38.6%
1960	2,500		−0.6%
1970	2,339		−6.4%
1980	2,196		−6.1%
1990	1,879		−14.4%
2000	1,693		−9.9%
2010	1,503		−11.2%
2020	1,501		−0.1%
2021 (est.)	1,473		−1.9%
U.S. Decennial Census

=== 2010 census ===
As of the census of 2010, there were 1,503 people, 616 households, and 397 families living in the town. The population density was 1,183.5 inhabitants per square mile (457.0/km^{2}). There were 700 housing units at an average density of 551.2 per square mile (212.8/km^{2}). The racial makeup of the town was 96.5% White, 1.6% African American, 0.2% Native American, 0.2% Asian, and 1.5% from two or more races. Hispanic or Latino of any race were 0.3% of the population.

There were 616 households, of which 26.3% had children under the age of 18 living with them, 42.2% were married couples living together, 15.7% had a female householder with no husband present, 6.5% had a male householder with no wife present, and 35.6% were non-families. 30.7% of all households were made up of individuals, and 13.6% had someone living alone who was 65 years of age or older. The average household size was 2.29 and the average family size was 2.83.

The median age in the town was 46.2 years. 18.5% of residents were under the age of 18; 9.4% were between the ages of 18 and 24; 20.6% were from 25 to 44; 28.7% were from 45 to 64; and 23.1% were 65 years of age or older. The gender makeup of the town was 43.5% male and 56.5% female.
