= George Hume (surveyor) =

Scottish-born American surveyor and colonial official (1698–1760)

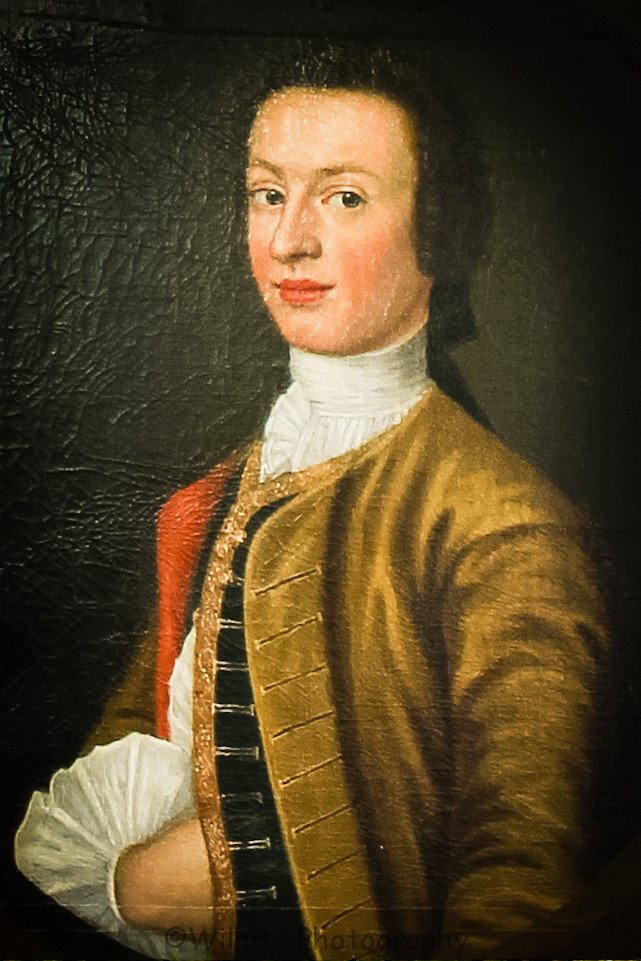
- Portrait c. 1710 – 1715
- Born: May 30 [N.S. June 9], 1698; Wedderburn Castle, Kingdom of Scotland
- Died: between April 2 and June 19, 1760 (aged 61–62); Culpeper County, Colony of Virginia, British America
- Other name: George Home
- Education: College of William and Mary
- Occupations: surveyor, colonial official
- Known for: mentoring George Washington in surveying (1748–49)
- Spouse: Elizabeth Proctor (m. 1727)
- Father: George Home of Wedderburn (1667–1720)
- Relatives: Sir George Home, comptroller (3rd great-grandfather); Alexander Spotswood (cousin)
- Family: Clan Home

George Hume, also spelled Home, (Note: Until 1746, George signed documents as "G.home", while his brothers used "Hume", with both spellings frequently appearing on the same page of old documents. Thereafter, he used "G.hume".) (May 30 [N.S. June 9], 1698 (Note: His birth year is sometimes given as 1697, which is unlikely, as his elder brother David is documented as being born that January 9.) – 1760) was a Scottish-born American surveyor and colonial official, known for his extensive land surveys in Virginia, particularly in the region that would become Culpeper County. A Jacobite exile following the 1715 rebellion, he immigrated to Virginia in 1721 and became a prominent surveyor for Orange, Frederick, Spotsylvania, and Culpeper counties. Hume mentored a young George Washington in surveying from 1748 to 1749, shaping his early career. A cousin of Lieutenant Governor Alexander Spotswood, Hume's precise mapping facilitated Virginia's colonial expansion and settlement.

== Early life and background ==
George Hume was born in 1698 at Wedderburn Castle, Berwickshire, Scotland, into a noble family, the feudal barons of Wedderburn, with deep roots in Scottish history.

His father, George Home of Wedderburn (1667–1720), married his cousin, Margaret, daughter of Sir Patrick Home, 1st Baronet of Lumsden.

Hume's grandfather, George Home (1641 – c. 1716), presumably succeeded as 2nd Baronet of Wedderburn. This title had been created circa 1638 by King Charles I for Hume's second great-grandfather, Sir David Home of Wedderburn (d. 1650 at the Battle of Dunbar), in recognition of his loyalty during the Covenanting struggle. After George Home's death circa 1716, the baronetcy or right to the title devolved on Hume's father, but was forfeited through attainder following his conviction for high treason in the 1715 Jacobite Rebellion, resulting in the loss of the family's title and estates. (Note: George Home (1641 – c. 1716) is listed as the 2nd Baronet in Complete Baronetage, but he does not appear to have assumed the title; some family genealogies, such as Hume (1930), claim Hume's father as the 3rd Baronet.)

Earlier in the family's history, Hume's third great-grandfather, Sir George Home of Wedderburn (1552–1616), briefly served as Comptroller of the Scottish Exchequer under James VI, showcasing the family's early administrative prominence. The Home family had a long tradition of service to the Scottish crown, holding significant lands and influence in the Border country of Scotland until the rebellion's consequences.

His cousin, Patrick Hume, 1st Earl of Marchmont, was Lord Chancellor of Scotland from 1696 to 1702. The Humes were royalists with a history of military and political service to the Stuart monarchy.

The Hume family had a strong naval tradition alongside George's surveying career. His brother Patrick served as a surgeon aboard HMS Sandwich under their brother, Captain John Hume, in 1746–47, but ill health forced him to retire ashore and farm in Berwickshire. John commanded the Sandwich as a guard ship for about a year and a half before being paid off; persistent gout ended his seagoing service, and he died of the disease on August 30, 1758. Another brother, Commander James Hume, captained the fireship HMS Pluto during the Seven Years' War and was killed in the Bay of Biscay on April 7, 1758 while engaging a French corsair.

=== Coat of arms ===
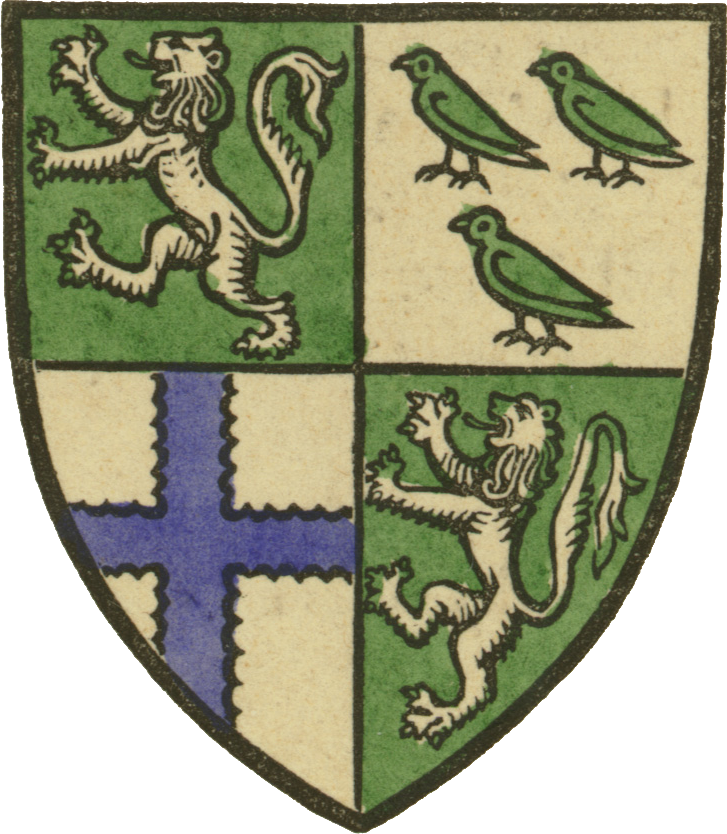
Coat of arms of Sir George Home, baron of Wedderburn (d. 1497) and his heirs

George Hume's heritage was symbolized by his coat of arms.

His seal, from a 1739 deed in the Orange County Circuit Clerk's Office, bears the arms of the Humes of Wedderburn: quarterly, 1st and 4th: vert, a lion rampant argent, armed and langued gules, for Hume; 2nd: argent, three papingoes vert, beaked and membered gules, for Pepdie of Dunglass; 3rd: argent, a cross engrailed azure, for Sinclair of Herdmanston and Polwarth. The crest features a unicorn's head and neck, couped argent, maned and horned or, collared with an open crown. The mottoes are "Remember" above the crest and "True to the End" below the arms.

== Stuart cause and Jacobite Rebellion of 1715 ==
The Hume family's loyalty to the Stuart cause was exemplified during the Jacobite Rebellion of 1715, which sought to restore the exiled James Francis Edward Stuart (the "Old Pretender") to the British throne. George Home of Wedderburn, Hume's father, was a committed Jacobite who supported the uprising, part of the broader movement to return the Stuarts to power.

The 1715 rebellion ended in failure, and many Jacobites, including the Humes, faced severe consequences. The family's estates were confiscated, and Hume was imprisoned for two years at the age of 17. He was then exiled to Virginia as an indentured servant, being placed aboard a Glasgow slave merchantman, but was later exchanged. His uncle Francis, who was also sentenced to Virginia as a prisoner, was freed by his cousin, Lieutenant Governor Spotswood, and was made a 'gentleman' in 1716. Francis then went on the Knights of the Golden Horseshoe Expedition.

== Immigration to Virginia and early career ==
In 1721, Hume immigrated to Virginia in poor health. On December 16, 1727, Hume married Elizabeth Proctor, a daughter of tobacco plantation owner, George Proctor.

Spotswood, who had served as the lieutenant governor of Virginia from 1710 to 1722, enrolled Hume in the College of William and Mary from 1722 to 1723, where he became a licensed surveyor. In 1727–1728, he was responsible for laying out the present-day city of Fredericksburg, Virginia, where he was surveyor for Spotsylvania County. A year later, he served as a lieutenant in the Spotsylvania County militia under Captain William Bledsoe, producing his commission in open court and taking the oath on September 2, 1729.

Spotswood secured Hume a position as a deputy surveyor for the Northern Neck Proprietary, a vast land grant in Virginia owned by the Fairfax family; later he was promoted to surveyor for Lord Fairfax from 1743 to 1750.

== Surveyor ==
Hume quickly proved his worth as a surveyor and became responsible for surveying Orange, Frederick, Spotsylvania, and Culpeper counties. His work was essential in the orderly settlement and development of large tracts of land in Virginia. He was responsible for surveying significant portions of the Northern Neck, as well as other frontier areas that were being opened to European settlement.

In particular, Hume's work in St. Mark's Parish, coterminous with the future Culpeper County, was notable. It was here that his expertise as a surveyor had a lasting impact, not only in the physical development of the land but also in the training and mentorship of future surveyors, including George Washington.

In 1748, Hume began mentoring George Washington, then 16, who served as his deputy in the region that became Culpeper County. In 1749, Washington, now 17, was appointed the county's surveyor, a role shaped by Hume's guidance as one of Virginia's most experienced surveyors. Washington's early Fairfax land surveys directly reflected this training. This mentorship is often cited as a critical element in Washington's development, both as a leader and as a figure of national importance.

== Later life and land transactions ==
On December 12–13, 1735, Hume of Spotsylvania County leased and released 260 acres (110 ha) of land in Orange County to Edward Tiel for £12 sterling. The land was situated on the branches of Mountain Run, including a line from a patent granted to Robert Spotswood.

From July 19–21, 1736, Hume, now residing in St. Mark's Parish, Orange County, conveyed 350 acres (140 ha) in the great fork of the Rappahannock River to James Pollard for £17 current money. The land was located along the road from Germanna to the Mountain Run bridge, and was part of a patent originally granted to Charles Steuart, later transferred to Hume on June 4, 1734.

On September 13–14, 1737, Hume and his wife Elizabeth conveyed 300 acres (120 ha) of land in St. Mark's Parish, Orange County, to James Garton of St. George's Parish, Spotsylvania County, for £50 current money. The land was located on a branch of Mountain Run called Hungary and bordered properties owned by Col. Alexander Spotswood, John and Aaron Moore, Edward Tiel, and Robert Spotswood.

Hume conveyed a tract of land in Orange County to Thomas Wright Belfield of Richmond County for £28 current money on April 13–14, 1739. The land, located on a branch of Mountain Run, bordered Col. Spotswood's line.

On March 13–14, 1740 [N.S. 1741], Hume transferred 375 acres (152 ha) of land in Beverley Manor to Gibbons Jennings for £30 current money. The land was situated on the south river of Shenandoah and bordered the lines of Robert Turk, Samuel Guy, and the patent of Beverley Manor. The transaction was witnessed by Robert McClanahan and Robert Erwin, and was acknowledged on March 26, 1741.

On August 27, 1745, Hume deeded 343 acres (139 ha) of land in St. Mark's Parish along Hungry Run [Mountain Run] to William Morris of Orange County. This tract, originally patented to Charles Stuart on August 21, 1734, was part of a larger parcel that Hume had purchased in March 1741 through William Beverley, Gent. The land was initially patented by Lt. Governor Alexander Spotswood. The transaction was overseen by Robert McClanahan.

On January 19, 1753, Hume sold, or conveyed, 50 acres (20 ha), to Johann Heinrich Bach (aka John Henry Back), who had immigrated in 1740, settled on that land around 1743, built a cabin, and cleared a large amount of land and planted crops. The land was along the north side of Meander Run (aka Crooked Creek), and may have even been part of Hume's 322 acres, at the juncture of Meander Run and the Robinson River. This 50 acres bordered the land of Henry Field.

On December 11–12, 1757, Hume of Culpeper County leased and released 3,000 acres (1,200 ha) to Henry Field of the same county for £30 current money. The land, originally patented to Charles Stewart on August 1, 1735, was acknowledged by Stewart to Hume through deeds of lease and release on September 13, 1735, in the Orange County Court. The tract was located on the north side of Meander Run, at the mouth of a branch corner to Field, extending to the fork of a branch, and included lines bordering Robert Spotswood's line and Colonel Alexander Spotswood's line, as well as the corner of a patent formerly granted to Francis Kirtley. The transaction was witnessed by Will Stanton, George Hume Jr., and Francis Hume. Henry Field was a member of the House of Burgesses.

Hume continued his work as a surveyor and colonial official until his death in 1760. His surveys supported Virginia's development, including areas of Culpeper County where his family settled southeast of present-day Brightwood, now in Madison County (formed 1792). His work ensured lands were ready for ownership and governance.

== Family ==
Hume and his wife Elizabeth had several children. Their eldest son, George Jr. (1729–1802), served as a private and later sergeant in Captain William Payne Jr.'s company of the 1st Virginia State Regiment during the American Revolutionary War from September 1777 to March 1778. Their second son, Francis (1730–1813), served in the Culpeper County militia under Captain John Field during the French and Indian War before becoming a captain in the Virginia Line during the Revolutionary War. Francis was an original member of the Society of the Cincinnati.
