= John Stuart (Virginia settler) =

American politician

Member of the Virginia Ratifying Convention from Greenbrier County
- In office 1788

Personal details
- Born: December 2, 1749 Augusta County, Colony of Virginia
- Died: August 18, 1823 (aged 74) Greenbrier County, Virginia
- Resting place: Stuart Manor, Greenbrier County, Virginia
- Occupation: Pioneer, military officer, politician

Military service
- Allegiance: United States
- Branch/service: Virginia militia
- Rank: Colonel
- Battles/wars: American Revolutionary War; Battle of Point Pleasant; Fort Randolph; Fort Stuart

Colonel John Stuart (17 March 1749 in Augusta County, Virginia – 18 August 1823 in Greenbrier County, Virginia [now West Virginia]) was a Revolutionary War commander, author and pioneering western Virginia settler. A veteran of the Battle of Point Pleasant (1774), he surveyed and settled the Greenbrier Valley and is known locally as the "Father of Greenbrier County". Owing to his Memoir of Indian Wars and Other Occurrences, written in 1799, he has been called "the most important chronicler of pioneer history in southern West Virginia".

== Early life ==
Stuart's father, the Scotsman David Stuart, was among the supporters of Charles Edward Stuart ("Bonnie Prince Charlie") as king of Great Britain. Soon after the Prince's army lost the Culloden (1746), David immigrated to America. He settled in then vast Augusta County, Virginia on the Shenandoah River, some distance from the town of Staunton.

== Career ==
At the age of twenty, John Stuart was among the Augusta County residents who ventured west in 1769 to explore the wilderness of the Greenbrier Valley and survey for European settlers. The following year he built the first mill in present-day Greenbrier County, at Frankford. In 1774, he led a company of Greenbrier troops in the Battle of Point Pleasant at the confluence of the Kanawha and Ohio Rivers. On 18 November 1776, he married Agatha Lewis (1753-1836), daughter of lawyer, surveyor and Virginia pioneer Thomas Lewis (1718–1790) and granddaughter of Virginia pioneer John Lewis (1678–1762). In 1777, Stuart — then at Fort Randolph, which had just been built on the site of the Battle of Point Pleasant — witnessed the slaughter of four Indians including the Shawnee Chief Cornstalk who had been there to explain the Shawnee attitude toward the British and Americans. (Cornstalk's own desire was for peace but the young Shawnee youth wanted war.) These murders by a mob were denounced by Patrick Henry and the Continental Congress.

In 1778, Stuart was commander of troops when the last Indian raid on Fort Donnally, near Lewis Spring (Lewisburg), occurred. (Lewisburg was named for Agatha's uncle, Andrew Lewis [1720–1782].) He was among the city of Lewisburg's first trustees and in 1780 he became the county's first clerk, leaving many historic records behind. (His first office in Lewisburg—in his own yard—is still standing.) He attended the 1788 Virginia Ratifying Convention and advocated ratification of the U.S. Constitution. In 1789 Stuart built a large stone house ("Stuart Manor") at Fort Spring (which he ended up commanding and which was later called Fort Stuart) near Lewisburg. Stuart also donated land for the first county courthouse and the Old Stone Church in Lewisburg.

Stuart was a correspondent of Thomas Jefferson and in 1796 he sent Jefferson fossil bones he had obtained from a salt petre cave about five miles from his home. These specimens fascinated Jefferson and were eventually determined to be tens of thousands of years old and to represent Megalonyx jeffersonii, or Jefferson's Ground Sloth. (With his publication of his commentary, Jefferson is considered to have initiated the discipline of vertebrate paleontology in the United States.)

Stuart was elected a member of the American Philosophical Society in 1797.

== Death and legacy ==
Stuart died in 1823 and is buried in the family cemetery at "Stuart Manor" with his wife.

== Works ==
- Stuart, John (1799; 1st published in 1833), Memoir of Indian Wars and Other Occurrences by the Late Colonel Stuart of Greenbrier (Reprinted in 1970 by Ayer Company Publishers [68 pgs] with Charles A. Stuart as editor; Series: Eyewitness Accounts of the American Revolution, No. 3), this memoir includes an account of the Battle of Point Pleasant and of Cornstalk's murder.
