= Calvary Morris =

American politician (1798–1871)

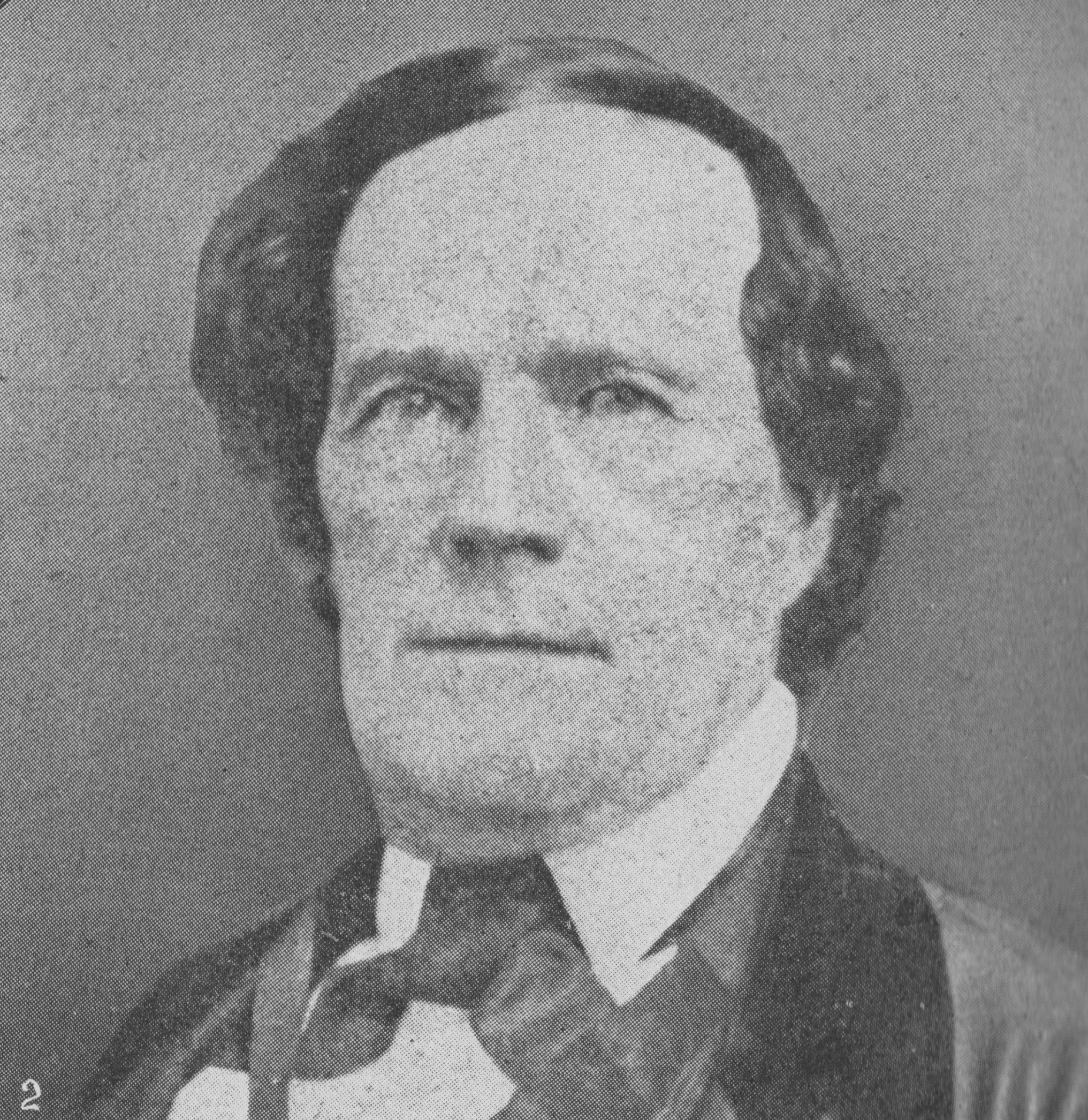

Member of the U.S. House of Representatives from Ohio's 6th district
- In office March 4, 1837 – March 3, 1843
- Preceded by: Samuel Finley Vinton
- Succeeded by: Henry St. John

Member of the Ohio House of Representatives from Athens County
- In office December 3, 1827 – December 6, 1829
- Preceded by: Robert Linzee
- Succeeded by: John Gilmore

Member of the Ohio House of Representatives from Athens County and Hocking County
- In office December 7, 1835 – December 4, 1836
- Preceded by: Elijah Hatch
- Succeeded by: David Jones

Member of the Ohio Senate from Washington County, Athens County and Hocking County
- In office December 7, 1829 – December 4, 1831
- Preceded by: William R. Putnam
- Succeeded by: Arius Nye

Member of the Ohio Senate from Washington County, Athens County and Hocking County
- In office December 2, 1833 – December 6, 1835
- Preceded by: Arius Nye
- Succeeded by: Andrew Donnally

Personal details
- Born: January 15, 1798 Charleston, Virginia, U.S.
- Died: October 13, 1871 (aged 73) Athens, Ohio, U.S.
- Resting place: Athens Cemetery
- Party: Whig

Calvary Morris (January 15, 1798 – October 13, 1871) was an American politician and three term member of the United States House of Representatives from Ohio from 1837 to 1843.

== Early life and career ==
Born in Charleston, Virginia (now West Virginia), Morris attended the common schools. He moved to Ohio in 1819 and settled in Athens. He was sheriff of Athens County 1823-1827. Morris is the son of Revolutionary War Veteran Captain John Morris, who served alongside Daniel Boone - during Lord Dunmore's War in 1774 through 1791 in Kanawha County, Virginia's inaugural County military foundation.

He served as a member of the Ohio House of Representatives 1827-1829. He served as a member of the Ohio Senate 1829-1835, and was again a member of the Ohio House of Representatives in 1835 and 1836.

== Congress ==
Morris was elected as a Whig to the Twenty-fifth, Twenty-sixth, and Twenty-seventh Congresses (March 4, 1837 – March 3, 1843). He served as chairman of the Committee on Invalid Pensions (Twenty-seventh Congress). He was not a candidate for renomination in 1842.

== Retirement and death ==
Retiring from politics, Morris engaged in wool growing. In 1847, he moved to Cincinnati, Ohio, where he engaged in mercantile pursuits. He later returned to Athens and in 1854 was elected probate judge of Athens County.

Calvary Morris died in Athens, Ohio, on October 13, 1871, and was interred in Athens Cemetery.

He was a trustee of Ohio University from 1825 to 1848.

== Sources ==
- United States Congress. "Calvary Morris (id: M000973)". Biographical Directory of the United States Congress.

- Walker, Charles M (1869). History of Athens County, Ohio And Incidentally of the Ohio Land Company and the First Settlement of the State at Marietta etc. Robert Clarke & Company. pp. 346–348. "Morris."

U.S. House of Representatives
| Preceded by Samuel Finley Vinton | Member of the U.S. House of Representatives from Ohio's 6th congressional district March 4, 1837–March 3, 1843 | Succeeded by Henry St. John |
Ohio House of Representatives
| Preceded by Robert Linzee | Representative from Athens County; December 3, 1827-December 6, 1829 | Succeeded by John Gilmore |
| Preceded by Elijah Hatch | Representative from Athens & Hocking counties December 7, 1835-December 4, 1836 | Succeeded by David Jones |
Ohio Senate
| Preceded by William R. Putnam | Senator from Washington, Athens & Hocking counties December 7, 1829-December 4, 1831 | Succeeded by Arius Nye |
| Preceded by Arius Nye | Senator from Athens & other counties December 2, 1833-December 6, 1835 | Succeeded by Andrew Donnally |
