= National Register of Historic Places listings in Greenbrier County, West Virginia =

Location of Greenbrier County in West Virginia

This is a list of the National Register of Historic Places listings in Greenbrier County, West Virginia.

This is intended to be a complete list of the properties and districts on the National Register of Historic Places in Greenbrier County, West Virginia, United States. The locations of National Register properties and districts for which the latitude and longitude coordinates are included below, may be seen in an online map.

There are 47 properties and districts listed on the National Register in the county, 1 of which is a National Historic Landmark.

This National Park Service list is complete through NPS recent listings posted April 25, 2025.

Contents: Counties in West Virginia

Barbour - Berkeley - Boone - Braxton - Brooke - Cabell - Calhoun - Clay - Doddridge - Fayette - Gilmer - Grant - Greenbrier - Hampshire - Hancock - Hardy - Harrison - Jackson - Jefferson - Kanawha - Lewis - Lincoln - Logan - Marion - Marshall - Mason - McDowell - Mercer - Mineral - Mingo - Monongalia - Monroe - Morgan - Nicholas - Ohio - Pendleton - Pleasants - Pocahontas - Preston - Putnam - Raleigh - Randolph - Ritchie - Roane - Summers - Taylor - Tucker - Tyler - Upshur - Wayne - Webster - Wetzel - Wirt - Wood - Wyoming

== Current listings ==
	Name on the Register	Image	Date listed	Location	City or town	Description
1	Alderson Bridge	Alderson Bridge	December 4, 1991 (#91001730)	Monroe St. across the Greenbrier River; 37°43′29″N 80°38′36″W	Alderson	
2	Alderson Historic District	Alderson Historic District	November 12, 1993 (#93001231)	Roughly along Monroe St., Riverview Dr., Railroad Ave., and adjacent streets 37°43′29″N 80°38′32″W	Alderson	
3	Arbuckle's Fort		November 18, 2024 (#100011010)	Blaker's Mill Road; 37°45′42″N 80°36′36″W	Alderson	
4	Alexander W. Arbuckle I House		May 3, 1976 (#76001933)	2 miles north of Lewisburg on Arbuckle Lane; 37°51′41″N 80°25′24″W	Lewisburg	
5	Argabrite House	Argabrite House	April 16, 2009 (#08001236)	504 Virginia St. 37°43′48″N 80°38′10″W	Alderson	
6	Sam Black Church	Sam Black Church	March 5, 1999 (#99000288)	U.S. Route 60 at its junction with County Route 60/5; 37°53′55″N 80°37′50″W	Smoot	
7	Blue Bend Forest Camp		April 20, 1994 (#94000352)	4 miles west of WV 92 on Alvon-Blue Bend-Anthony Rd., County Route 16/2; 37°55′14″N 80°16′06″W	Alvon	
8	Blue Sulphur Springs Pavilion	Blue Sulphur Springs Pavilion	October 29, 1992 (#92001481)	County Route 25, 9 miles north of Alderson; 37°49′42″N 80°38′30″W	Blue Sulphur Springs	
9	Chapel of the Immaculate Conception of the Blessed Virgin Mary		April 29, 2025 (#100011744)	Catholic Church Road; 37°57′33″N 80°26′57″W	Williamsburg	
10	Confederate Cemetery at Lewisburg	Confederate Cemetery at Lewisburg	February 2, 1988 (#87002535)	Maple St. and U.S. Route 60, Library Park; 37°48′07″N 80°27′06″W	Lewisburg	
11	David S. Creigh House		November 12, 1975 (#75001888)	Southwest of Lewisburg off the Davis-Stuart Rd. 37°46′14″N 80°28′33″W	Lewisburg	
12	Deitz Farm	Deitz Farm	April 17, 1992 (#92000304)	Junction of County Routes 28 and 60/32; 37°54′34″N 80°40′10″W	Meadow Bluff	
13	Edgefield	Edgefield	December 12, 2012 (#12001047)	461 Brownstown Rd. 37°59′47″N 80°21′21″W	Renick	
14	Elmhurst		June 5, 1975 (#75001887)	U.S. Route 60 at the Greenbrier River; 37°46′50″N 80°23′47″W	Caldwell	
15	Greenbrier County Courthouse and Lewis Spring	Greenbrier County Courthouse and Lewis Spring	August 17, 1973 (#73001900)	Corner of Court and Randolph Sts. 37°48′11″N 80°26′46″W	Lewisburg	
16	The Greenbrier	The Greenbrier	October 9, 1974 (#74002000)	Off U.S. Route 60; 37°47′41″N 80°20′09″W	White Sulphur Springs	
17	Hartland		June 10, 1975 (#75001889)	2 miles west of Lewisburg on Houfnaggle Rd. 37°48′06″N 80°28′29″W	Lewisburg	
18	Herns Mill Covered Bridge	Herns Mill Covered Bridge	June 4, 1981 (#81000598)	County Route 40 near its junction with County Route 60/11; 37°49′57″N 80°30′18″W	Lewisburg	
19	Hokes Mill Covered Bridge	Hokes Mill Covered Bridge	June 4, 1981 (#81000599)	County Route 62 at Hokes Mill crossing of Second Creek; 37°41′50″N 80°31′30″W	Ronceverte	
20	Homeplace		January 17, 2008 (#07001415)	U.S. Route 219 North; 37°54′43″N 80°22′55″W	Frankford	
21	Hopkins Mountain Historic District		April 14, 1994 (#94000353)	Along Forest Road 139 (Hopkins Mountain Rd), north of County Road 16/2 (Alvon-Blue Bend-Anthony Road), approximately 4 miles west of WV 92; 37°57′08″N 80°15′52″W	Alvon	
22	Lewisburg Historic District	Lewisburg Historic District	July 7, 1978 (#78002795)	Irregular pattern along U.S. Routes 60 and 219; 37°48′06″N 80°26′44″W	Lewisburg	
23	Maple Street Historic District	Maple Street Historic District	April 6, 1988 (#87002529)	107-121 Maple St. 37°48′18″N 80°26′58″W	Lewisburg	
24	McClung's Price Place	McClung's Price Place	August 3, 2007 (#07000782)	699 Savannah Ln. 37°53′39″N 80°24′59″W	Lewisburg	
25	Meadow River Lumber Building		November 13, 1997 (#97001411)	U.S. Route 219 South at State Fair of West Virginia; 37°46′39″N 80°27′45″W	Fairlea	
26	Alexander McVeigh Miller House	Alexander McVeigh Miller House	December 15, 1978 (#78002794)	Hemlock Ave. 37°43′53″N 80°38′05″W	Alderson	
27	Morlunda		March 25, 1977 (#77001374)	Northwest of Lewisburg on County Route 40; 37°49′54″N 80°29′28″W	Lewisburg	
28	Mountain Home		November 28, 1980 (#80004020)	Southwest of White Sulphur Springs on U.S. Route 60; 37°46′24″N 80°21′10″W	White Sulphur Springs	Boundary increase approved December 23, 2020
29	Mt. Tabor Baptist Church	Mt. Tabor Baptist Church	December 12, 1976 (#76001934)	Court and Foster Sts. 37°48′07″N 80°26′50″W	Lewisburg	
30	New Deal Resources in Greenbrier State Forest Historic District		August 7, 2019 (#100002851)	1541 County Road 6/2 (Harts Run Rd.); 37°41′07″N 80°21′50″W	Caldwell	
31	John A. North House	John A. North House	October 9, 1974 (#74001998)	100 Church St. 37°48′11″N 80°26′54″W	Lewisburg	
32	Oakhurst Links		December 4, 2001 (#01001327)	1 Montague Dr. 37°49′41″N 80°16′47″W	White Sulphur Springs	
33	Old Stone Church	Old Stone Church	February 23, 1972 (#72001286)	Church and Foster Sts. 37°48′04″N 80°26′55″W	Lewisburg	
34	Organ Cave	Organ Cave	May 5, 2005 (#05000397)	WV 63, 0.5 miles east of its junction with U.S. Route 219; 37°43′12″N 80°26′09″W	Ronceverte	
35	Gov. Samuel Price House	Gov. Samuel Price House	June 20, 1975 (#75001890)	224 N. Court St. 37°48′15″N 80°26′39″W	Lewisburg	
36	Renick Farm	Renick Farm	April 4, 1997 (#96000525)	U.S. Route 219 near its junction with County Route 9; 37°59′00″N 80°21′04″W	Renick	
37	Ronceverte Historic District	Ronceverte Historic District	May 6, 2005 (#05000396)	Roughly along Main St., Pocahontas, Monroe, and Greenbrier Avenues; 37°45′00″N 80°28′03″W	Ronceverte	
38	Rupert School		August 25, 2022 (#100008074)	S. Church St. 37°58′06″N 80°40′52″W	Lewisburg	
39	South Church Street Historic District	South Church Street Historic District	February 2, 1988 (#87002528)	S. Church St. 37°48′02″N 80°27′00″W	Lewisburg	
40	Stone Manse		April 15, 2004 (#04000307)	County Route 38 (Stonehouse Rd.); 37°47′52″N 80°22′45″W	Caldwell	
41	Stuart Manor		July 27, 1973 (#73001901)	Southwest of Lewisburg off U.S. Route 219; 37°45′58″N 80°29′59″W	Lewisburg	
42	Supreme Court Library Building	Supreme Court Library Building	February 23, 1972 (#72001287)	U.S. Route 60 West and Courtney Dr. 37°48′12″N 80°26′53″W	Lewisburg	
43	Tuckwiller Tavern		March 4, 1975 (#75001891)	2 miles northwest of Lewisburg on U.S. Route 60; 37°49′21″N 80°28′45″W	Lewisburg	
44	Tuscawilla		December 19, 1979 (#79002576)	South of Lewisburg off U.S. Route 219; 37°47′00″N 80°27′00″W	Lewisburg	
45	John Wesley Methodist Church	John Wesley Methodist Church	June 5, 1974 (#74001997)	E. Foster St. 37°47′59″N 80°26′40″W	Lewisburg	
46	James Withrow House	James Withrow House	December 31, 1974 (#74001999)	200 N. Jefferson St. 37°48′14″N 80°26′35″W	Lewisburg	
47	James Wylie House		February 5, 1990 (#89002318)	208 E. Main St. 37°47′48″N 80°17′52″W	White Sulphur Springs	

== See also ==
- List of National Historic Landmarks in West Virginia
- National Register of Historic Places listings in West Virginia
