= Lewisburg Historic District (Lewisburg, West Virginia) =

Historic district in West Virginia, United States

- U.S. National Register of Historic Places
- U.S. Historic district
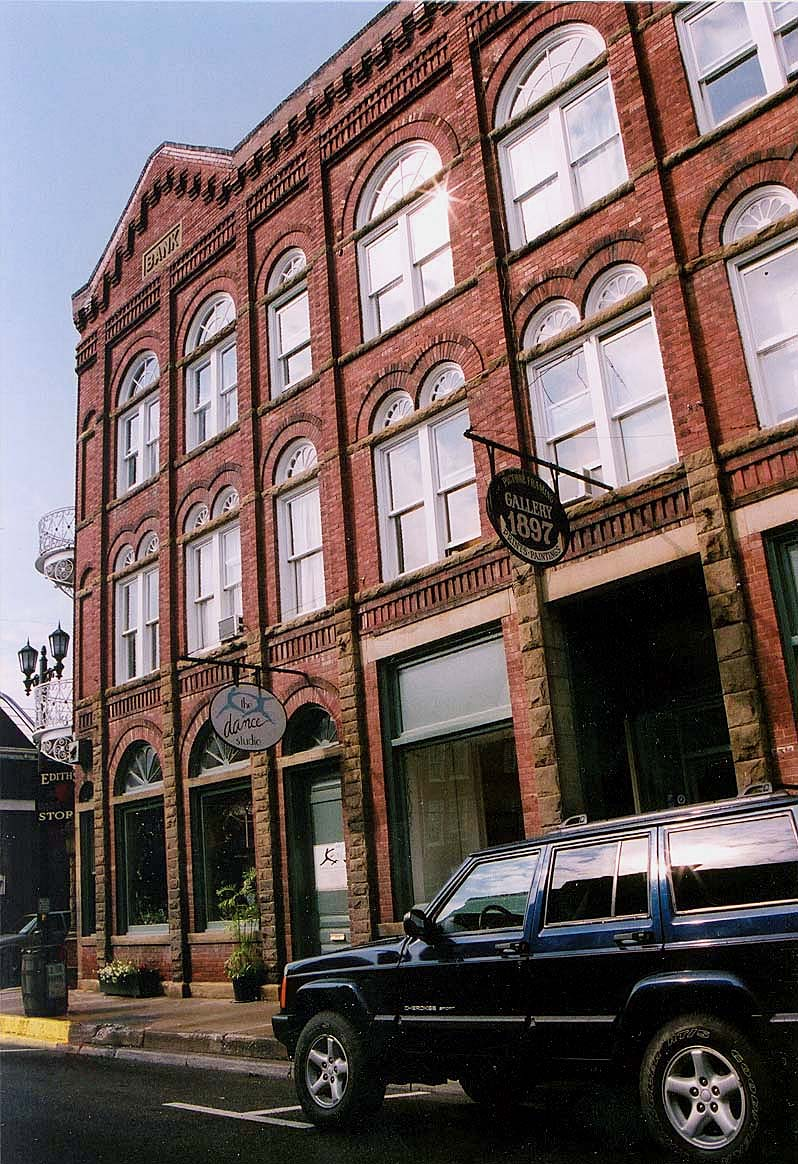
- Downtown Lewisburg, August 2004

- Location within West Virginia Location within the United States
- Location: Irregular pattern along U.S. 60 and U.S. 219, Lewisburg, West Virginia
- Coordinates: 37°49′22″N 80°26′7″W
- Area: 350 acres (140 ha)
- Architect: Multiple
- Architectural style: Bungalow/craftsman, Late Victorian, Georgian
- NRHP reference No.: 78002795
- Added to NRHP: July 7, 1978

Lewisburg Historic District is a national historic district located at Lewisburg, Greenbrier County, West Virginia. The district encompasses 112 contributing buildings and are representative of the development and evolution of Lewisburg, over a period of more than two centuries (1763-1977). Notable buildings include log cabins dating to the period 1755–1769, "The Barracks," Mount Esperance (1814), Williams-Henning Store/house (1814-1820), Welch-Bell House (1824), John W. Dunn House (c. 1834), John Withrow's Store/ House (1836), Greenbrier Valley Bank Building (1897), and Carnegie Hall (1902). Located in the district and separately listed are the Old Stone Church, Greenbrier County Courthouse and Lewis Spring, John Wesley Methodist Church, Gov. Samuel Price House, Mt. Tabor Baptist Church, Supreme Court Library Building, James Withrow House, and John A. North House.

It was listed on the National Register of Historic Places in 1978.
