= Leonard, West Virginia =

- Unincorporated community
- Location within West Virginia Location within the United States
- Coordinates: 38°04′58″N 80°24′12″W
- Country: United States
- State: West Virginia
- County: Greenbrier
- Elevation: 2,300 ft (700 m)
- Time zone: UTC-5 (Eastern (EST))
  - Summer (DST): UTC-4 (EDT)
- Area codes: 304 & 681
- GNIS feature ID: 1554942

Leonard is an unincorporated community in Greenbrier County, West Virginia, United States. Leonard is 7 miles (11 km) north-northwest of Falling Spring.

The community was named after Leonard Mitchell, an early settler.
