= Reithoffer Shows =

Reithoffer Shows, Inc.
- Company type: Privately held company
- Industry: Amusement - Midway
- Founded: 1896
- Headquarters: Gibsonton, Florida
- Key people: Richard H Reithoffer (President)
- Products: Amusement ride rental/operation and traveling carnival management
- Revenue: Unknown
- Number of employees: Unknown
- Website: Reithoffer Shows

Reithoffer Shows, Inc. is a North American, family-owned and operated traveling midway. They provide carnival and fair rides, games, and food to fairgrounds located mainly along the East Coast of the United States. Events featuring a Reithoffer Shows midway are held from April through November. The company's headquarters are located in Gibsonton, Florida, USA.

== Rides and attractions ==
Reithoffer Shows owns a wide range of rides and attractions. Some examples are listed here.

=== Thrill rides ===
- Tango
- Dutch Wheel
- Speed
- Zipper
- Tornado (a HUSS Flipper)
- Gentle Giant
- Racing (Roller Coaster)
- Indy Racer Coaster
- Stinger (New, Technical Park Loop Fighter)
- Starship 3000
- Ring of Fire
- Full Tilt (Flying Dutchman)
- The Beast
- Banshee Roller Coaster

=== Family rides ===
- Barnyard
- Mardi Gras
- Century Wheel
- Gravity Storm
- Tornado (manufactured by Wisdom)
- Wild Mouse
- Himalaya
- Super Himalaya
- Tilt a Whirl
- Wacky Worm
- Iron Dragon (Dragon Wagon)

=== Kiddie rides ===
- Bear Affair
- Dizzy Dragons
- Bumble Bee
- Choo Choo Charlie Train
- Crazy Bus (Fire Chief)
- Demolition Derby
- Fun Slide
- Giant Wheel (Dutch Wheel)
- Classic Carousel

== Popular Events ==
Reithoffer Shows hosts a wide array of events along the east coast.

=== Notable Events ===
- National Peanut Festival – Dothan, Alabama
- Florida State Fair – East Lake-Orient Park, Florida
- West Virginia State Fair – Fairlea, West Virginia
- Cleveland County Fair – Shelby, North Carolina
- Jefferson County Fair – Watertown, New York
- Brockton Fair – Brockton, Massachusetts
