= Sam Black Church, West Virginia =

Sam Black Church
- Unincorporated community
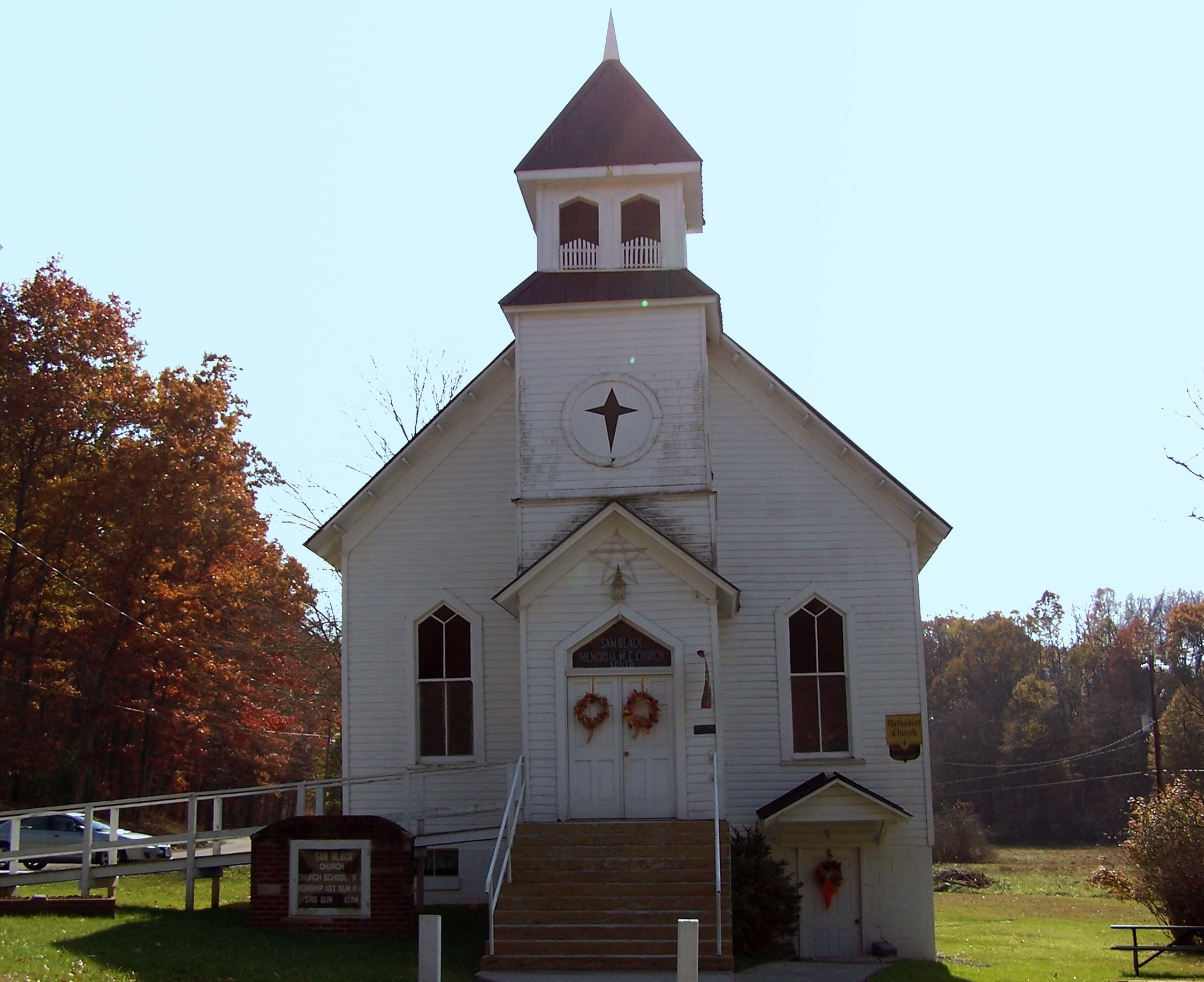
- Historic Sam Black Church

- Location within the state of West Virginia Sam Black Church (the United States)
- Coordinates: 37°53′56″N 80°37′52″W
- Country: United States
- State: West Virginia
- County: Greenbrier
- Time zone: UTC-5 (Eastern (EST))
  - Summer (DST): UTC-4 (EDT)

Sam Black Church is an unincorporated community in Greenbrier County, West Virginia, United States. It is located at the intersection of Interstate 64 and U.S. Route 60 on the Midland Trail, a National Scenic Byway. The community is named for the Sam Black Church, a Registered Historic Place built in 1902 which is nearby. Reverend Sam Black was a Southern Methodist preacher and circuit rider who preached an area stretching multiple counties from Kanawha County to Greenbrier County and helping to establish numerous churches in the area. He died on July 13, 1899, at the age of 86.

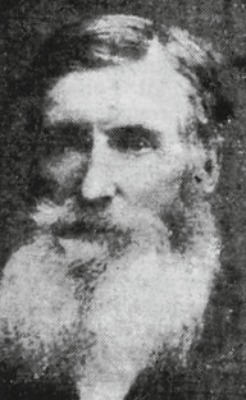
Rev. Sam Black, taken circa 1870s

== In popular culture ==
A hardcore punk band from Boston, Massachusetts named their band Sam Black Church after this community as it is where their drummer J.R. Roach was living at the time.
