= Whiteoak Grove, West Virginia =

- Unincorporated community
- Location within West Virginia Location within the United States
- Coordinates: 38°00′05″N 80°20′00″W
- Country: United States
- State: West Virginia
- County: Greenbrier
- Elevation: 2,165 ft (660 m)
- Time zone: UTC-5 (Eastern (EST))
  - Summer (DST): UTC-4 (EDT)
- Area codes: 304 & 681
- GNIS feature ID: 1553434

Whiteoak Grove is an unincorporated community in Greenbrier County, West Virginia, United States. Whiteoak Grove is 1.5 miles (2.4 km) east-northeast of Falling Spring.
