= Blue Bend, West Virginia =

Unincorporated community in West Virginia, United States

- Unincorporated community
- Location within West Virginia Location within the United States
- Coordinates: 37°55′18″N 80°16′07″W
- Country: United States
- State: West Virginia
- County: Greenbrier
- Elevation: 1,949 ft (594 m)
- Time zone: UTC-5 (Eastern (EST))
  - Summer (DST): UTC-4 (EDT)
- Area codes: 304 & 681
- GNIS feature ID: 1550392

Blue Bend is an unincorporated community in Greenbrier County, West Virginia, United States. Blue Bend is 6.5 miles (10.5 km) southeast of Falling Spring.
