= Edgefield =

Edgefield may refer to:

- Edgefield, Norfolk, United Kingdom

In the United States:

- Edgefield, Louisiana
- Edgefield, Ohio, an unincorporated community
- Multnomah County Poor Farm, Troutdale, Oregon, operated as a lodging and entertainment complex under the name McMenamins Edgefield
- Edgefield, South Carolina
- Edgefield County, South Carolina
- Edgefield (Renick, West Virginia), a historic house and farm complex
