= Woodman, West Virginia =

- Unincorporated community
- Location within West Virginia Location within the United States
- Coordinates: 37°54′43″N 80°18′55″W
- Country: United States
- State: West Virginia
- County: Greenbrier
- Elevation: 1,837 ft (560 m)
- Time zone: UTC-5 (Eastern (EST))
  - Summer (DST): UTC-4 (EDT)
- Area codes: 304 & 681
- GNIS feature ID: 1556021

Woodman is an unincorporated community in Greenbrier County, West Virginia, United States. Woodman is located on the Greenbrier River, 6 miles (9.7 km) southeast of Falling Spring.
