= Esty, West Virginia =

Unincorporated community in West Virginia, United States

- Unincorporated community
- Location within West Virginia Location within the United States
- Coordinates: 38°00′54″N 80°22′58″W
- Country: United States
- State: West Virginia
- County: Greenbrier
- Elevation: 1,936 ft (590 m)
- Time zone: UTC-5 (Eastern (EST))
  - Summer (DST): UTC-4 (EDT)
- Area codes: 304 & 681
- GNIS feature ID: 1554412

Esty is an unincorporated community in Greenbrier County, West Virginia, United States. Esty is 2 miles (3.2 km) northwest of Falling Spring.

Esty Stinespring, an early postmaster, gave the community its name.
