= John W. Dunn (architect) =

American architect

John W. Dunn was an architect and master builder in West Virginia.

Dunn worked often in conjunction with master wood-worker Conrad Burgess. Burgess did mantels and other interior wood-work for Morlunda and Mountain Home, for example.

A number of his works are listed on the U.S. National Register of Historic Places.

Works include (attribution):

- Alexander W. Arbuckle I House, 2 mi. N of Lewisburg on Arbuckle Lane Lewisburg, WV (Dunn, John W.), NRHP-listed
- David S. Creigh House (built 1834), SW of Lewisburg off the Davis-Stuart Rd. Lewisburg, WV (Dunn, John W.), NRHP-listed
- Greenbrier County Courthouse and Lewis Spring, Corner of Court and Randolph Sts. Lewisburg, WV (Dunn, John W.), NRHP-listed
- John Wesley Methodist Church, E. Foster St. Lewisburg, WV (Dunn, John W.), NRHP-listed
- Morlunda, NW of Lewisburg on SR 40 Lewisburg, WV (Dunn, John W.), NRHP-listed
- Mountain Home, SW of White Sulphur Springs on U.S. 60 White Sulphur Springs, WV (Dunn, John W.), NRHP-listed
- Tuckwiller Tavern, 2 mi. NW of Lewisburg on U.S. 60 Lewisburg, WV (Dunn, John W.), NRHP-listed
- Tuscawilla, S of Lewisburg off U.S. 219 Lewisburg, WV (Dunn, John W.), NRHP-listed
