= Blue Bend Forest Camp =

- U.S. National Register of Historic Places
- U.S. Historic district
- Location within West Virginia Location within the United States
- Nearest city: Alvon, West Virginia
- Coordinates: 37°55′14″N 80°16′6″W
- Area: 26 acres (11 ha)
- Architect: Stoddard, Herbert Tilden; CCC
- Architectural style: Bungalow/Craftsman
- NRHP reference No.: 94000352
- Added to NRHP: April 20, 1994

Blue Bend Forest Camp, also known as Blue Bend Recreation Area, is a historic recreational area near Alvon, West Virginia. The site was planned and developed by the Civilian Conservation Corps from 1936 to 1938 and is one of four CCC-built recreational areas in Monongahela National Forest. Anthony Creek runs through the camp, and a pool on the creek known as Blue Hole is a fishing area and one of the main features of the site. Blue Bend Forest Camp also includes log picnic shelters and twenty-one campsites. The camp was added to the National Register of Historic Places on April 20, 1994.
