= Elmhurst (Caldwell, West Virginia) =

Historic house in West Virginia, United States

- U.S. National Register of Historic Places
- Location within West Virginia Location within the United States
- Location: U.S. 60 at the Greenbrier R., Caldwell, West Virginia
- Coordinates: 37°46′50″N 80°23′47″W
- Area: 6 acres (2.4 ha)
- Built: 1824
- NRHP reference No.: 75001887, 90001846
- Added to NRHP: June 5, 1975, December 20, 1990 (Boundary Increase)

Elmhurst, also known as The Caldwell Place, is a historic inn and tavern located at Caldwell, Greenbrier County, West Virginia. It was built in 1824 on the banks of the Greenbrier River near where a toll bridge for the James River and Kanawha Turnpike replaced a ferry crossing in 1821. It is a two-story red brick building, consisting of a 50-foot-wide (15 m) by 50-foot-deep (15 m) main section and a 50-foot (15 m) by 25-foot (7.6 m) ell. It features a two-story open portico supported by four square columns and capped by an ornamental stepped gable. The listing also includes three contributing frame dependencies, a gravel approach driveway, an early 20th-century stone wall, and a portion of the original road bed of the James River and Kanawha Turnpike.

It was listed on the National Register of Historic Places in 1975, and a boundary increase was added in 1990.
