= Meadow River Lumber Building =

- U.S. National Register of Historic Places
- Location within West Virginia Location within the United States
- Location: US 219 S, State Fair of West Virginia, Fairlea, West Virginia
- Coordinates: 37°46′39″N 80°27′45″W
- Area: less than one acre
- Built: 1928
- Built by: Meadow River Lumber Company
- Architectural style: Bungalow/American craftsman
- NRHP reference No.: 97001411
- Added to NRHP: November 13, 1997

Meadow River Lumber Building is a historic building located on the grounds of the State Fair of West Virginia at Fairlea, Greenbrier County, West Virginia. It was built in 1928, to showcase the products of the Meadow River Lumber Company (MERILUCO). It is a one-story, Bungalow-style frame building with a small center front gable rising from the roofline. The front facade features a full length front porch.

It was listed on the National Register of Historic Places in 1997.
