= Hopkins Mountain Historic District =

Historic district in West Virginia, United States

- U.S. National Register of Historic Places
- U.S. Historic district
- Location within West Virginia Location within the United States
- Location: Along Forest Road 139 (Hopkins Mountain Rd), north of County Road 16/2 (Alvon-Blue Bend-Anthony Road), approximately 4 miles west of WV 92, near Alvon, West Virginia
- Coordinates: 37°57′8″N 80°15′52″W
- Area: 105 acres (42 ha)
- Built by: Civilian Conservation Corps
- Architectural style: Bungalow/craftsman
- NRHP reference No.: 94000353
- Added to NRHP: April 14, 1994

Hopkins Mountain Historic District is a national historic district located in the Monongahela National Forest near Alvon, Greenbrier County, West Virginia. The district encompasses two contributing buildings, one contributing site, and two contributing structures. It includes the Mountain Tower Road (Forest Service Road 139), fire tower and the fireman'sresidence. They were all constructed by the members of Camp Alvon of the Civilian Conservation Corps (CCC) in 1935. The house is a Bungalow style, gable roofed dwelling measuring 14 by 20 feet (4.3 by 6.1 m). Located nearby is a contemporary privy with board-and-batten siding and a gable roof, also built by the CCC. The property also includes the Civil War Trail. It was used by the Virginia 26th Battalion under the command of Lt. Colonel George M. Edgar for its retreat from the Battle of Droop Mountain on November 6 and 7, 1863. Also on the property is a logging tramway in use from about 1908 to the 1920s.

It was listed on the National Register of Historic Places in 1994.
