= Sam Black Church (band) =

American hardcore band

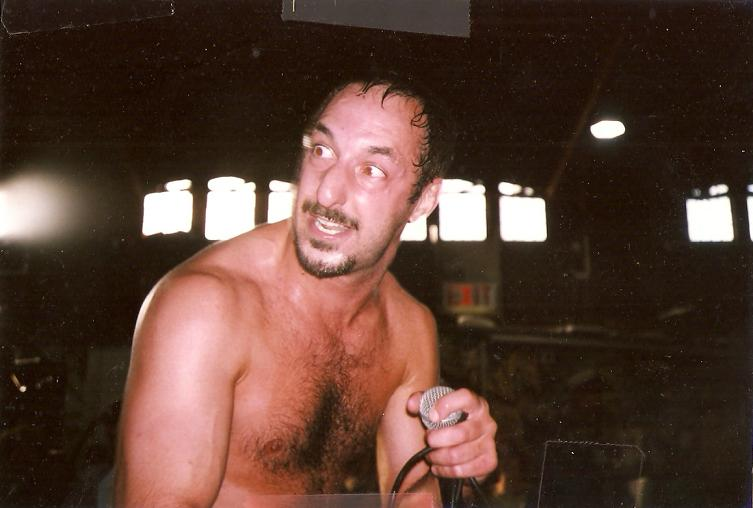
- Jesse "Jet" Crandall

Background information
- Origin: Boston, Massachusetts, U.S.
- Genres: Hardcore punk, metalcore, thrash metal, groove metal, alternative metal
- Years active: 1988–2000, 2007, 2013, 2014, 2016–present
- Labels: Taang!, Untangled, Wonderdrug
- Members: Jesse "Jet" Crandall; Ben Crandall; Richard G. Lewis; J.R. Roach; Zack Andrien

Sam Black Church (also known as SBC) is an American hardcore/metal band. It was named after the West Virginia community of Sam Black Church.

== History ==
After releasing their first three EPs on Taang! Records, Sam Black Church self-released a CD and then signed with Wonderdrug Records where they remained until the band broke up in 2000.

Sam Black Church reunited for a sold out show on September 22, 2007, at The Roxy in Boston. Unearth, Madball and Darkbuster opened the show. Sam Black Church played the Hometown Throwdown 16, with The Mighty Mighty Bosstones, at House of Blues in Boston, on December 29, 2013. They reunited again in 2016 for three sold out shows at The Sinclair and Brighton Music Hall in Boston, celebrating the release of Duncan Wilder Johnson's documentary on the band, Leave Behind a Groove in the Earth. The band reunited once again in early October 2021 at the Paradise Rock Club in Boston for back-to-back nights during the "Boston Rocks For Julie Duffy" fundraiser event. Guitarist Ben Crandall auctioned off one of his B.C. Rich guitars immediately after the performance to help raise funds. The instrument ultimately sold for $3,400 to the highest bidder at the club that night.

== Musical style and legacy ==
Sam Black Church was known for their monstrous sound, unique vocals, and energetic live performances. They played a frenetic blend of hardcore, metal, and thrash and shared the bill with acts as diverse as Bad Brains, Clutch, Motörhead, Cro-Mags, Nothingface, Stuck Mojo, and Helmet. They were one of the most popular hardcore bands in the northeast United States for a period in the mid-1990s.

The band is the subject of the documentary film Leave Behind a Groove in the Earth: The Story of Sam Black Church. Notable appearances providing commentary on the band's influence include Bad Brains' Dr. Know, Page Hamilton of Helmet, Lamb of God's Randy Blythe, and Neil Fallon of Clutch.

== Discography ==
Albums

- Let in Life (1993)
- That Which Does Not Kill Us... (1997)
- The Black Comedy (1998)

EPs

- Unincorporated (1989)
- Sam Black Church (1993)
- Superchrist (1995)

Compilations

- For We Are Many – The Best of Sam Black Church (2001)
