= Reverend Sam Black =

Sam Black
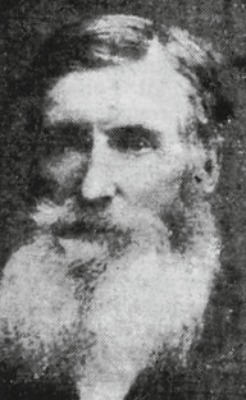
- Photograph of Reverend Sam Black

Personal life
- Born: Samuel Black; March 3, 1813 Greenbrier County, West Virginia, U.S.
- Died: July 13, 1899 (aged 86) Greenbrier County, West Virginia, U.S.
- Resting place: Blacks Farm Cemetery, Rupert, West Virginia

Religious life
- Religion: Christianity
- Denomination: Methodist
- Church: West Virginia Methodist Conference
- Profession: Circuit Rider

Reverend Samuel Black (March 3, 1813 – July 13, 1899) was a Methodist circuit riding preacher from Greenbrier County, West Virginia. Largely based in Greenbrier County, the Reverend also preached through the counties of Kanawha, Braxton, Webster, Nicholas, Fayette, Jackson, and Clay. One of 16 founding members of the West Virginia Methodist Conference, Reverend Black was ordained as a deacon in 1844 and continued to preach until near his death. The community of Sam Black Church, West Virginia along with its centerpiece, the Sam Black Methodist Church were named after the influential preacher shortly after his death.
