= Stone Manse =

Historic house in West Virginia, United States

- U.S. National Register of Historic Places
- Location within West Virginia Location within the United States
- Location: County Route 38 (Stonehouse Rd.), near Caldwell, West Virginia
- Coordinates: 37°47′52″N 80°22′45″W
- Area: 1.4 acres (0.57 ha)
- Built: 1796, 1833
- Architectural style: Federal
- NRHP reference No.: 04000307
- Added to NRHP: April 15, 2004

Stone Manse is a historic manse located near Caldwell, Greenbrier County, West Virginia. It was built in 1796, and is a 2 1/2-story, gable roofed, Federal style dwelling. It was built using brown, red, and gray stones from the nearby Greenbrier River. A wood-frame addition was completed in 1833. The house served as the first manse of the Old Stone Presbyterian Church in Lewisburg and was originally the home of Reverend Benjamin Porter Grigsby, the congregation's second minister.

It was listed on the National Register of Historic Places in 2004.
