= Tuckwiller Tavern =

- U.S. National Register of Historic Places
- Location within West Virginia Location within the United States
- Location: 2 miles northwest of Lewisburg on U.S. Route 60, near Lewisburg, West Virginia
- Coordinates: 37°49′21″N 80°28′45″W
- Area: 2 acres (0.81 ha)
- Built: 1826-1828
- Built by: John W. Dunn; David K. Spotts
- Architectural style: Greek Revival
- NRHP reference No.: 75001891
- Added to NRHP: March 4, 1975

Tuckwiller Tavern, also known as Valley View Stock Farm, Inc. and Wilson Farm, is a historic tavern located at Lewisburg, Greenbrier County, West Virginia. It was built between 1826 and 1828, and is a large, two-story (plus basement) rectangular brick building with a one-story ell in an early rusticated Greek Revival style. It sits on a fieldstone foundation and features a portico supported by four massive, white wooden columns. Also on the property is a brick smokehouse. During the American Civil War, it was used as a headquarters and barracks in 1864 by Union General David Hunter.

It is believed to have been built by "local brickmasons, contractors, and 'architects'" John W. Dunn and David K. Spotts.

It was listed on the National Register of Historic Places in 1975.
