= Meadow Bluff, West Virginia =

- Unincorporated community
- Location within West Virginia Location within the United States
- Coordinates: 37°54′13″N 80°39′05″W
- Country: United States
- State: West Virginia
- County: Greenbrier
- Elevation: 2,457 ft (749 m)
- Time zone: UTC-5 (Eastern (EST))
  - Summer (DST): UTC-4 (EDT)
- Area codes: 304 & 681
- GNIS feature ID: 1543049

Meadow Bluff is an unincorporated community in Greenbrier County, West Virginia, United States. Meadow Bluff is 4.5 miles (7.2 km) southeast of Rupert.

The community was named after the meadows and bluffs near the original town site. Located near Meadow Bluff is the Deitz Farm, listed on the National Register of Historic Places in 1992.
