= James Wylie House =

Historic house in West Virginia, United States

- U.S. National Register of Historic Places
- Location within West Virginia Location within the United States
- Location: 208 E. Main St., White Sulphur Springs, West Virginia
- Coordinates: 37°47′48″N 80°17′52″W
- Area: 1 acre (0.40 ha)
- Built: c. 1825, 1906
- Built by: James Wylie
- Architect: James Wylie
- Architectural style: Italianate, Georgian
- NRHP reference No.: 89002318
- Added to NRHP: February 5, 1990

James Wylie House, also known as The Shamrock, O'Connell House, and Hanna House, is a historic home located at White Sulphur Springs, Greenbrier County, West Virginia. It was built before 1825, and is a 2 1/2-story, red brick house with a Georgian style floorplan. A remodeling executed in 1906, added Italianate style design elements to the roofline and window openings. Also on the property is a settlement period, two story log cabin and a miniature stone replica of a castle. It is operated as a bed and breakfast.

It was listed on the National Register of Historic Places in 1990.
