= Mountain Home (White Sulphur Springs, West Virginia) =

Historic house in West Virginia, United States

- U.S. National Register of Historic Places
- Location within West Virginia Location within the United States
- Location: Southwest of White Sulphur Springs on U.S. Route 60, near White Sulphur Springs, West Virginia
- Coordinates: 37°46′24″N 80°21′10″W
- Area: 1 acre (0.40 ha)
- Built: c. 1833
- Built by: Dunn, John W.; Burgess, Conrad
- Architectural style: Federal, Roman Revival
- NRHP reference No.: 80004020 (original); 100005944 (increase)

Significant dates
- Added to NRHP: November 28, 1980
- Boundary increase: December 23, 2020

Mountain Home, also known as Locust Hill and Robert Dickson House, is a historic home located near White Sulphur Springs, Greenbrier County, West Virginia. It was built about 1833, and is a large, two-story brick dwelling with a kitchen ell. It features a two-story, one-bay lunette-adorned pediment with plastered brick Doric order paired columns. It has Late Federal and Roman Revival elements on both the exterior and interior.

It was built by "Greenbrier Valley master builder" John W. Dunn and includes mantels and other woodwork done by master wood-carver Conrad Burgess. Morlunda (Greenbrier County, West Virginia) is another of their joint works.

The house was listed on the National Register of Historic Places in 1980, with a boundary increase in 2020.
