= Alexander W. Arbuckle I House =

Historic house in West Virginia, United States

- U.S. National Register of Historic Places
- Location within West Virginia Location within the United States
- Location: 2 miles north of Lewisburg on Arbuckle Lane, near Lewisburg, West Virginia
- Coordinates: 37°51′41″N 80°25′24″W
- Area: 5 acres (2.0 ha)
- Built: 1822
- Architect: John W. Dunn
- Architectural style: Greek Revival
- NRHP reference No.: 76001933
- Added to NRHP: May 3, 1976

Alexander W. Arbuckle I House, also known as the Michael Baker House, is a historic home located near Lewisburg, Greenbrier County, West Virginia. It was built in 1822, and is a two-story, brick T-shaped residence with Greek Revival style influences. It features a two-story portico with four plastered round columns and Chinese Chippendale style railings.

It was designed and built by contractor and architect John W. Dunn and associates David Spott and Andrew White. The house is a farmhouse. It is regarded as the "'architectural gem' of the region".

It was listed on the National Register of Historic Places in 1976.
