= Blue Sulphur Springs, West Virginia =

Unincorporated community in West Virginia, United States

- Unincorporated community
- Location within West Virginia Location within the United States
- Coordinates: 37°49′30″N 80°38′10″W
- Country: United States
- State: West Virginia
- County: Greenbrier
- Elevation: 1,654 ft (504 m)
- Time zone: UTC-5 (Eastern (EST))
  - Summer (DST): UTC-4 (EDT)
- Area codes: 304 & 681
- GNIS feature ID: 1549600

Blue Sulphur Springs is an unincorporated community in Greenbrier County, West Virginia, United States. Blue Sulphur Springs is north of Alderson. It is named for a mineral spring near the original town site, distinguishing it from the larger and better-known White Sulphur Springs in the same county. It was the site of the Blue Sulphur Springs Resort, of which only the pavilion remains.

== See also ==
- List of ghost towns in West Virginia
