= James Withrow House =

Historic house in West Virginia, United States

- U.S. National Register of Historic Places
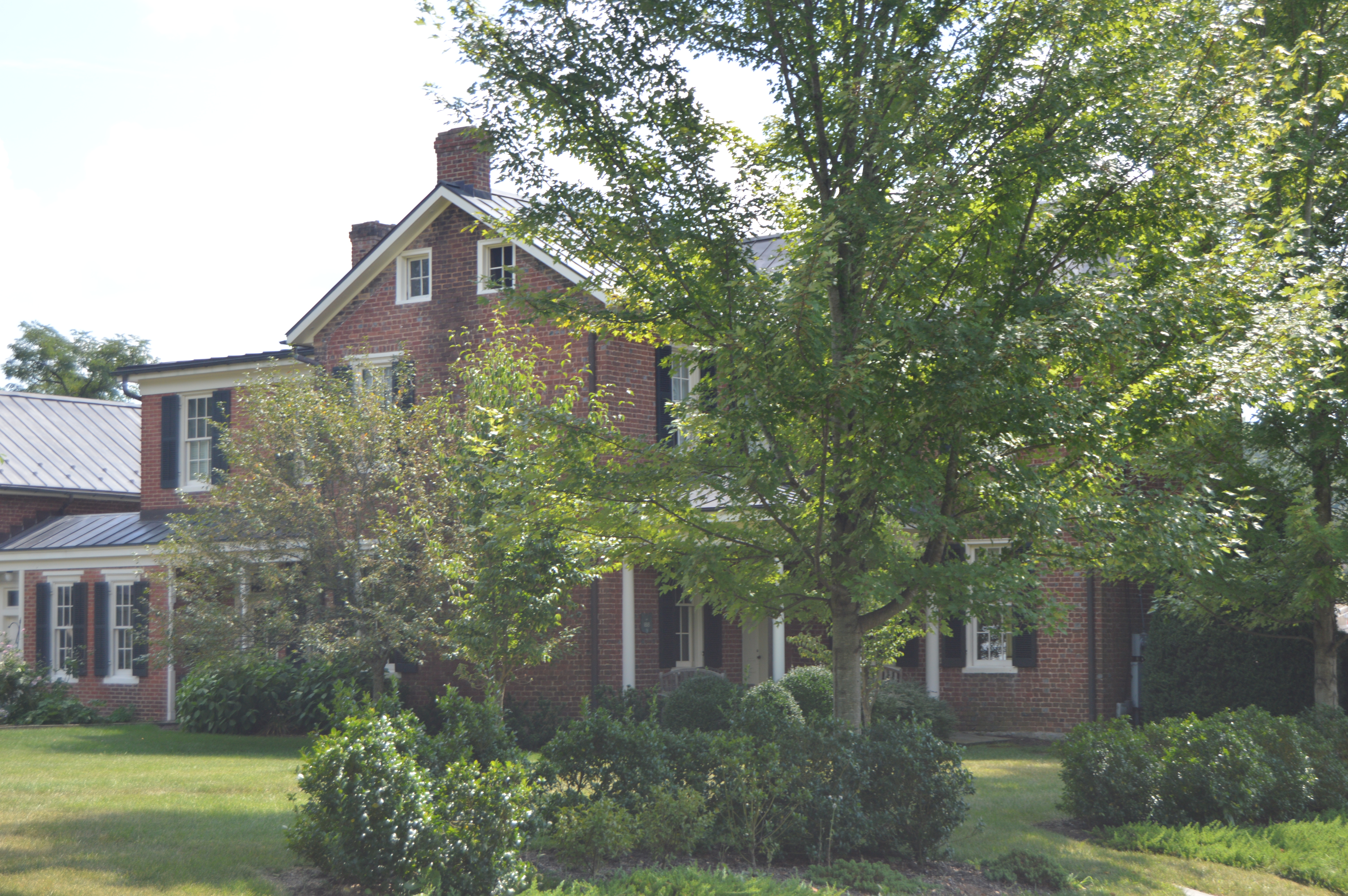
- Side of the house

- Location within West Virginia Location within the United States
- Location: Lewisburg, West Virginia
- Coordinates: 37°48′13.5″N 80°26′35″W
- Area: 1.5 acres (0.61 ha)
- Built: c. 1818
- Architect: John Weir
- Architectural style: Federal
- NRHP reference No.: 74001999
- Added to NRHP: December 31, 1974

The James Withrow House, also known as the John Montgomery House and Montwell, is a historic home located in Lewisburg, Greenbrier County, West Virginia. It is the oldest brick house still standing in the town.

It was listed on the National Register of Historic Places in 1974.

== History ==
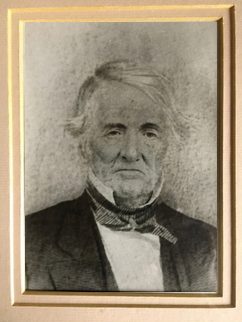
James Withrow I.

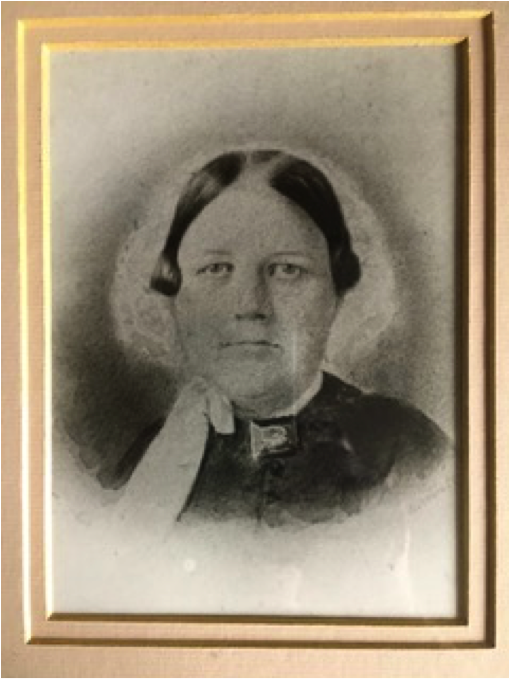
Letitia Withrow.

Built around 1818, the James Withrow House is one of the oldest brick houses in Lewisburg, West Virginia. Built for James Withrow I on land surveyed by Thomas Edgar in 1782, the house overlooks the historical site of Fort Savannah and Withrow I's tannery. James Withrow I moved to Lewisburg sometime before 1812 and married Letitia Edgar Withrow, the daughter of Thomas Edgar, the original surveyor of the town, with whom he had nine children. One of his sons, James Withrow II, continued his father's tanning business. Upon James Withrow I's death in 1843, the house was willed to John Withrow, but instead passed to James Withrow II, a ruling elder of the nearby Old Stone Church. A trained lawyer, James Withrow II served as a court commissioner and a member of the state legislature.

In August 1867, James Withrow II, a Colonel in the Virginia Militia, invited Robert E. Lee, visiting nearby White Sulfur Springs resort (now known as The Greenbrier), to a dinner at the house. Lee requested no public expressions of admiration, though many townspeople wished to speak with Lee. Lee spoke to them while visiting the house.

Following James Withrow II's death in 1901, his wife, Mary Withrow, sold the property to Nancy A. Surbaugh in 1905. Nancy Surbaugh's half-brother, Edward Sydenstricker, moved his family into the house during the Great Depression. Nancy Surbaugh oversaw the first renovation (see Renovations) of the house, which added an inside kitchen and Victorian era conveniences, among other additions. Nancy Surbaugh died, succeeded by the death of her half-brother Mr. Sydenstricker, sometime before 1939.

After their deaths, the house was unoccupied for two years until being listed at auction in 1941. John Fleshman Montgomery, principal of Lewisburg High School at the time, and his wife, Edith Rothwell Montgomery, bought the house at auction and subsequently renovated it (see Renovations), moving in on March 22, 1942. It was during this time that the house became known as the John Montgomery house, and as "Montwell", a joining of the names Montgomery and Rothwell.

In 2002, the house was purchased by one of John Montgomery's daughters, Mary Montgomery Lindquist, and her husband Paul Lindquist in 2002.

== Architecture ==
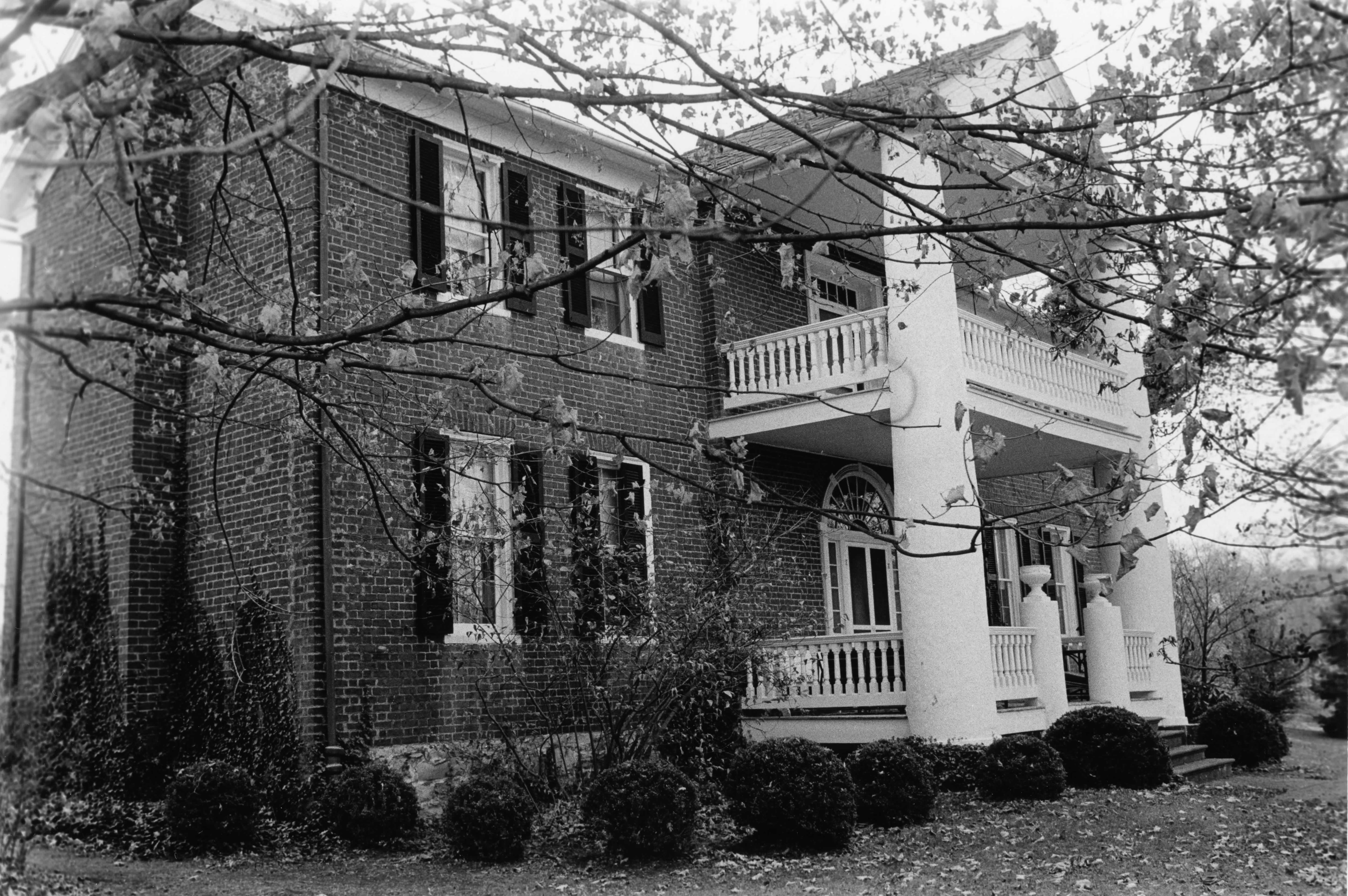
Front of the house c. 1974 showing the plastered brick columns of the double portico.

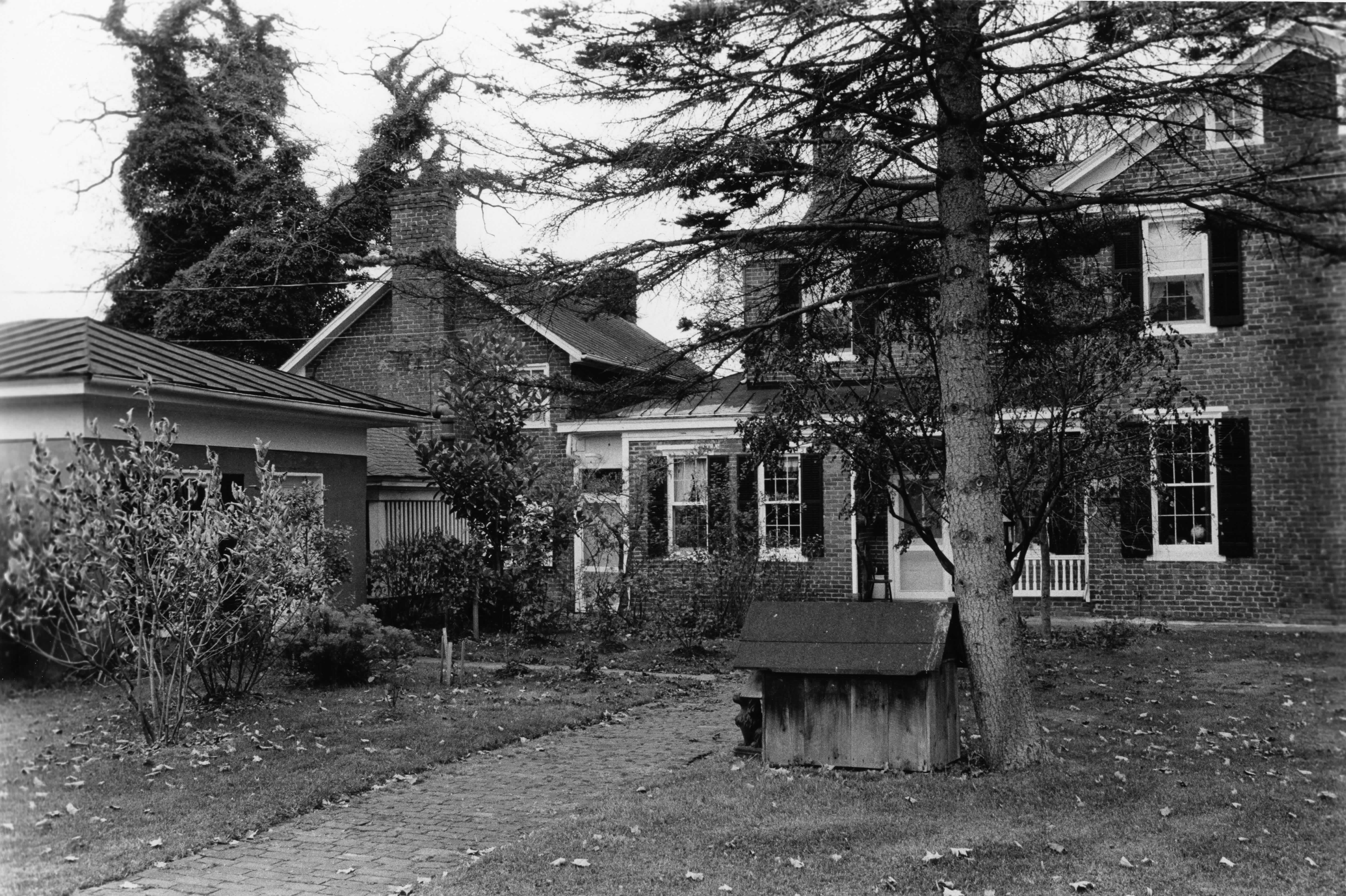
Rear of the house, with James Withrow II's office on the far left. Note the connecting space between the kitchen and former servant's quarters.

The James Withrow House is a two-story brick house with a two-story brick wing. It features a large double portico supported by massive plastered brick columns, reminiscent of classic revival innovations, reaching a high pediment. On the property is a two-story building housing the historical kitchen and servants quarters as well as a plastered brick building, built, sometime after 1843, as an office by James Withrow II. The office moved to its current location in 1915, after previously residing adjacent to the nearby road.

The house was designed and built by John Weir and constructed using bricks fired on-site. The brick pattern of the main house is Flemish bond, whereas the historical kitchen follows a random American bond (the pattern repeating an inconsistent amount, between five, nine or no courses). Following the first set of renovations, the brickwork of the connecting space used bricks sourced from off-site and a running bond instead of the Flemish bond used on the main house.

Though source materials state the architectural style as Colonial, the house exhibits characteristics of a Federal style such as a central doorway, Palladian windows, louvered shutters, and a fanlight window above the front door.

== Renovations ==
The first renovation, sometime between 1905 and 1915, was overseen by Nancy Surbaugh and added multiple rooms. An inside kitchen was added, as well as a bedroom above on the second floor. A pantry was built adjacent to the kitchen and the first bathroom inside the house was added. At this same time, the floors of the dining and living rooms were renovated, adding narrow oak flooring over the, wider, original pine floors. During this renovation, the historical kitchen was joined to the main house via a roofed connecting space. The windows were replaced with modern ones and the original wooden shingled roof was replaced with asbestos shingles. The old gas lines (used for oil lamps when the house was constructed) were replaced with electrical lines and the house's heating was centralized by means of a furnace. Nancy Surbaugh chose Victorian style radiators for the house and a large "clawfoot" bathtub to go in the new bathroom. It was during this renovation that the office was moved to the east side of the house from an unknown location.

The second renovation, carried out by John and Edith Montgomery, started in the fall of 1941 and was completed by March 22, 1942. The renovation consisted of mainly cosmetic changes, as well as renovation of the electrical, water, and heating systems. These included painting the walls and trim, sanding and staining the original pine floors, and replacing the Franklin stove, installed during the previous renovation, with a wood burning brick fireplace. As John and Edith Montgomery had a larger family than previously had resided in the house, the single bathroom was split into two, and an additional one built downstairs. The new kitchen, original kitchen, and connecting space all saw numerous improvements, with the latter receiving the majority. The connecting space was enclosed and served as a laundry room. The historical kitchen was converted to a two bedroom rental property, a purpose which survives to this day.

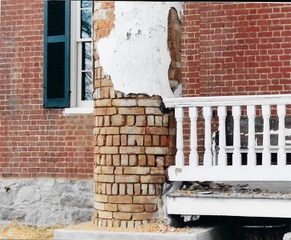
Plastered brick columns before the 2002 renovation, showing the construction method of the column.

The third renovation was completed in 2004. The most thorough renovation in the house's history, Mary and her husband Paul consulted structural engineers on the state of the house, resulting in a complete overhaul of most elements of the building. The asbestos roofing was replaced with standing-seam copper roofing, the house's electrical systems were replaced, a new heating and air system installed with the removal of the old radiators, the windows were replaced with modern reproductions of a federal style, the porch and brick columns strengthened, and chimneys lined. Further renovations included remodeling of all the bathrooms, stripping and repainting the walls with the original stenciled friezes applied sometime during the 1905 renovation, and the remodeling of the main kitchen. Renovations continued into the historical kitchen, receiving a similar treatment as the rest of the house.
