= Blue Sulphur Springs Pavilion =

- U.S. National Register of Historic Places
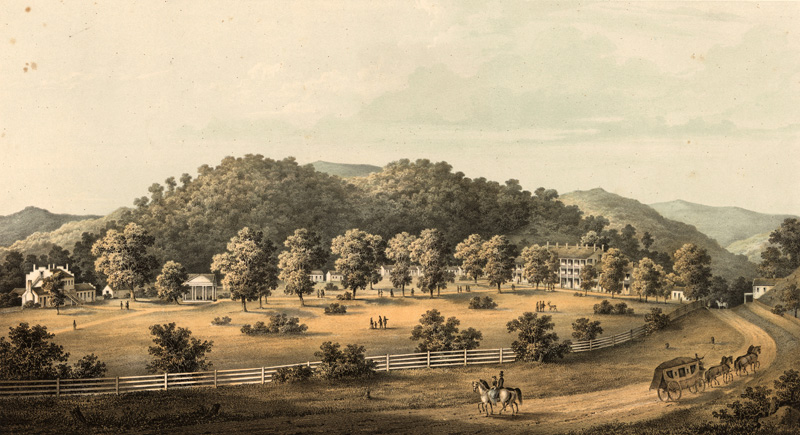
- The Blue Sulphur Springs Resort in 1857, with the pavilion visible on the left

- Location within West Virginia Location within the United States
- Location: Co. Rt. 25, 9 mi. N of Alderson, Blue Sulphur Springs, West Virginia
- Coordinates: 37°49′42″N 80°38′30″W
- Area: 30 acres (12 ha)
- Architect: Buster, George Washington
- Architectural style: Greek Revival
- NRHP reference No.: 92001481
- Added to NRHP: October 29, 1992

The Blue Sulphur Springs Pavilion is a historic Greek Revival structure in Blue Sulphur Springs, West Virginia, United States. The Pavilion is the only surviving structure from the Blue Sulphur Springs Resort, a 19th-century mineral spa, and was built to shelter the sulphur spring at the resort. The Pavilion consists of twelve columns holding up a square roof, and is primarily built with brick. It was built in 1834 along with the resort and was added to the National Register of Historic Places on October 29, 1992.

== Architecture ==
The Blue Sulphur Springs Pavilion is built on a square foundation, with sides measuring 32 feet and 10 inches. The foundation is brick with stone facing. Twelve columns rest on the foundation, giving the Pavilion an open structure; the columns are of a modified Doric order and are built of brick covered in plaster. The frieze of the Pavilion is undecorated and made of clapboard, and the cornices are plain; the simplicity of the structure here reflects its shelter-like nature. The Pavilion is topped with a four-sided hipped roof with clapboard pediments. A marble basin sits inside the Pavilion. The sulphur spring flows into the basin at a rate of 6 gallons per minute and a temperature of 58 degrees Fahrenheit. The Pavilion is the only resort pavilion in West Virginia and one of few rural structures built in the Greek Revival style. In his 1846 book on mineral springs, William Burke described the Pavilion as "well-designed but badly executed" and referred to the fountain inside as "one of the most beautiful objects imaginable."

== History ==
The Pavilion was constructed in 1834, the year the Blue Sulphur Springs Resort opened. George Washington Buster constructed the resort; it was named Blue Sulphur Springs for the iridescent color of the springs. The original resort included, along with the Pavilion, a three-story hotel with 200 rooms and a bathhouse. The resort was visited by several noteworthy guests in the 1840s, including Robert E. Lee, Henry Clay, and Presidents Andrew Jackson and Martin Van Buren. The resort was a prime spot for the promotion of relaxation and health, as the sulphur spring at the resort was considered to be a remedy for numerous diseases. Blue Sulphur Springs Resort began to decline in the 1850s due to competition from other resorts such as The Greenbrier and an economic downturn. The resort closed in 1859 and became Allegheny College, a school for Baptist ministers; the college closed in 1861. The resort buildings were used by both sides in the Civil War as a camp and hospital. In 1864, the Union Army burned the resort to prevent the Confederate Army from utilizing them; only the Pavilion survived the fire.

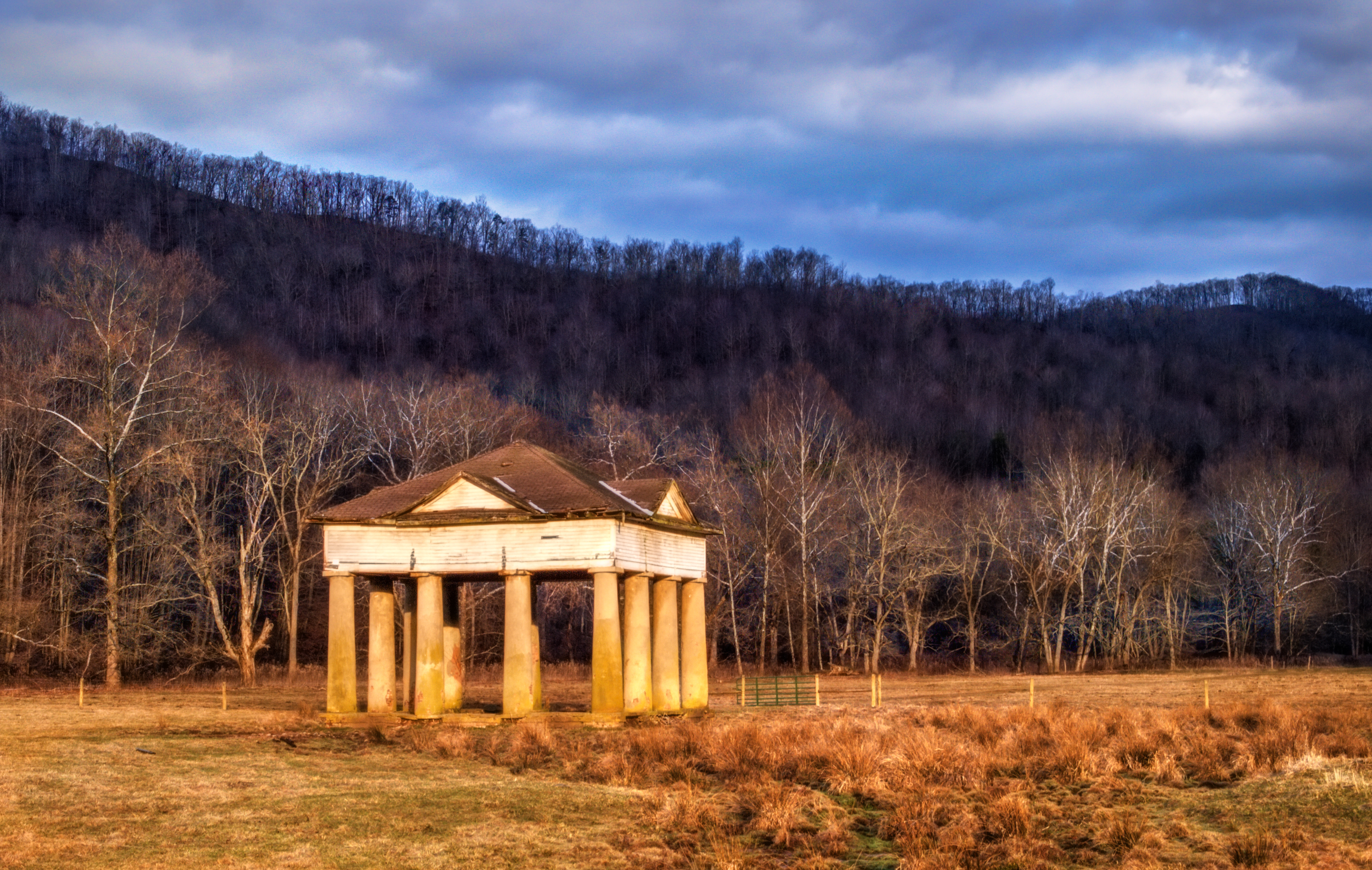
The pavilion of the former resort at Blue Sulphur Springs, West Virginia, taken March 22, 2014.

== Geography ==
The Blue Sulphur Springs Pavilion is located in a valley at the junction of the Kitchen Creek and Sawmill Hollow valleys. It is located in the region of thermal mineral springs in the Appalachian Mountains, and is one of several mineral springs in the area. The Pavilion is located in a rural landscape, and offers views of the surrounding valley. William Burke described the landscape surrounding the Blue Sulphur Springs Resort as "a beautiful valley", though he complained that the designer of the resort had blocked the view with buildings.
