= Sam Black Church =

Historic church in West Virginia, United States

- U.S. National Register of Historic Places
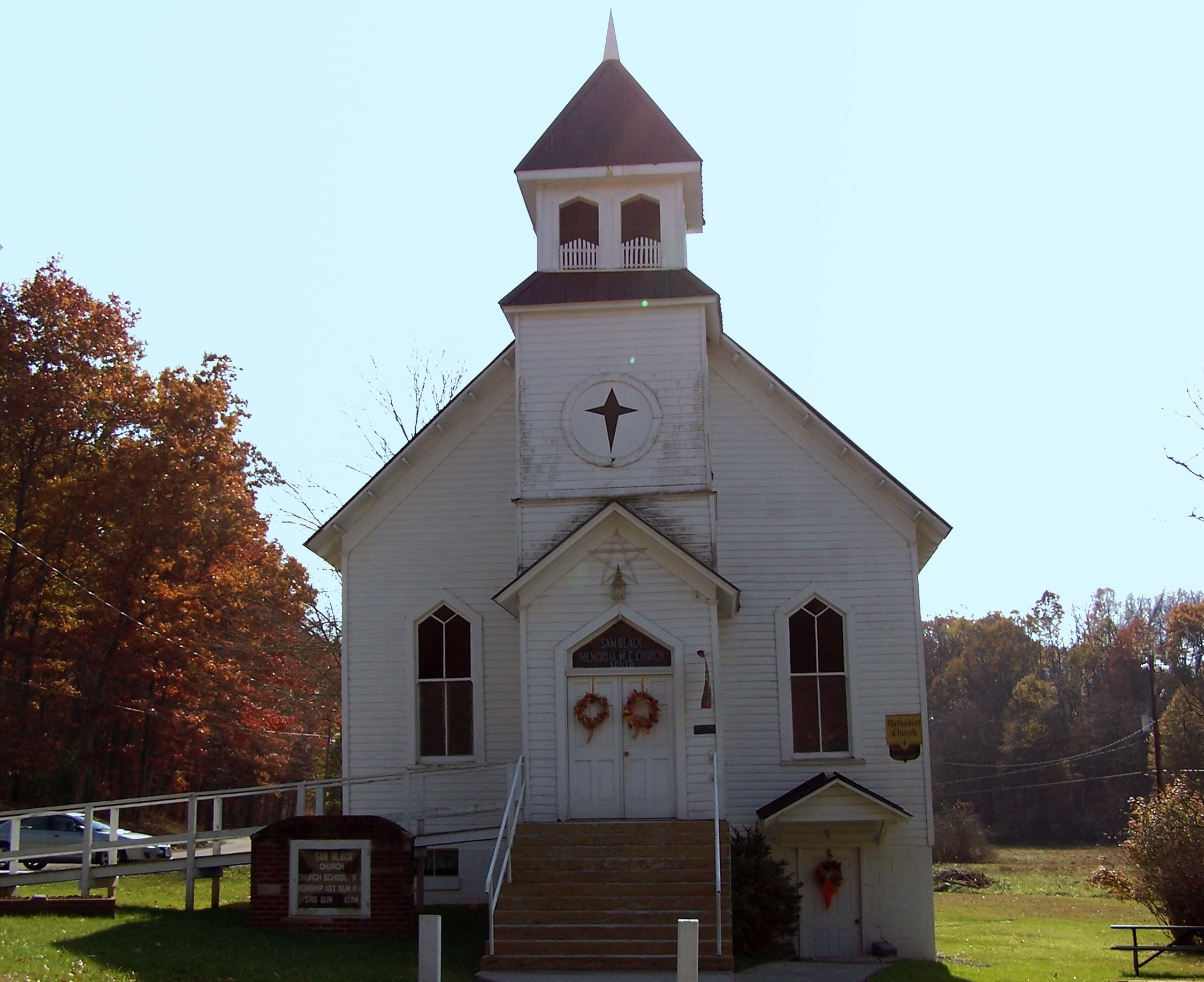
- Sam Black Church, November 2007

- Location within West Virginia Location within the United States
- Nearest city: Smoot, West Virginia
- Coordinates: 37°53′55″N 80°37′50″W
- Built: 1901
- Architectural style: Gothic Revival
- NRHP reference No.: 99000288
- Added to NRHP: March 5, 1999

Sam Black Church, known today as Sam Black United Methodist Church, is an historic Carpenter Gothic-style church located at Sam Black Church near the unincorporated community of Smoot in Greenbrier County, West Virginia.

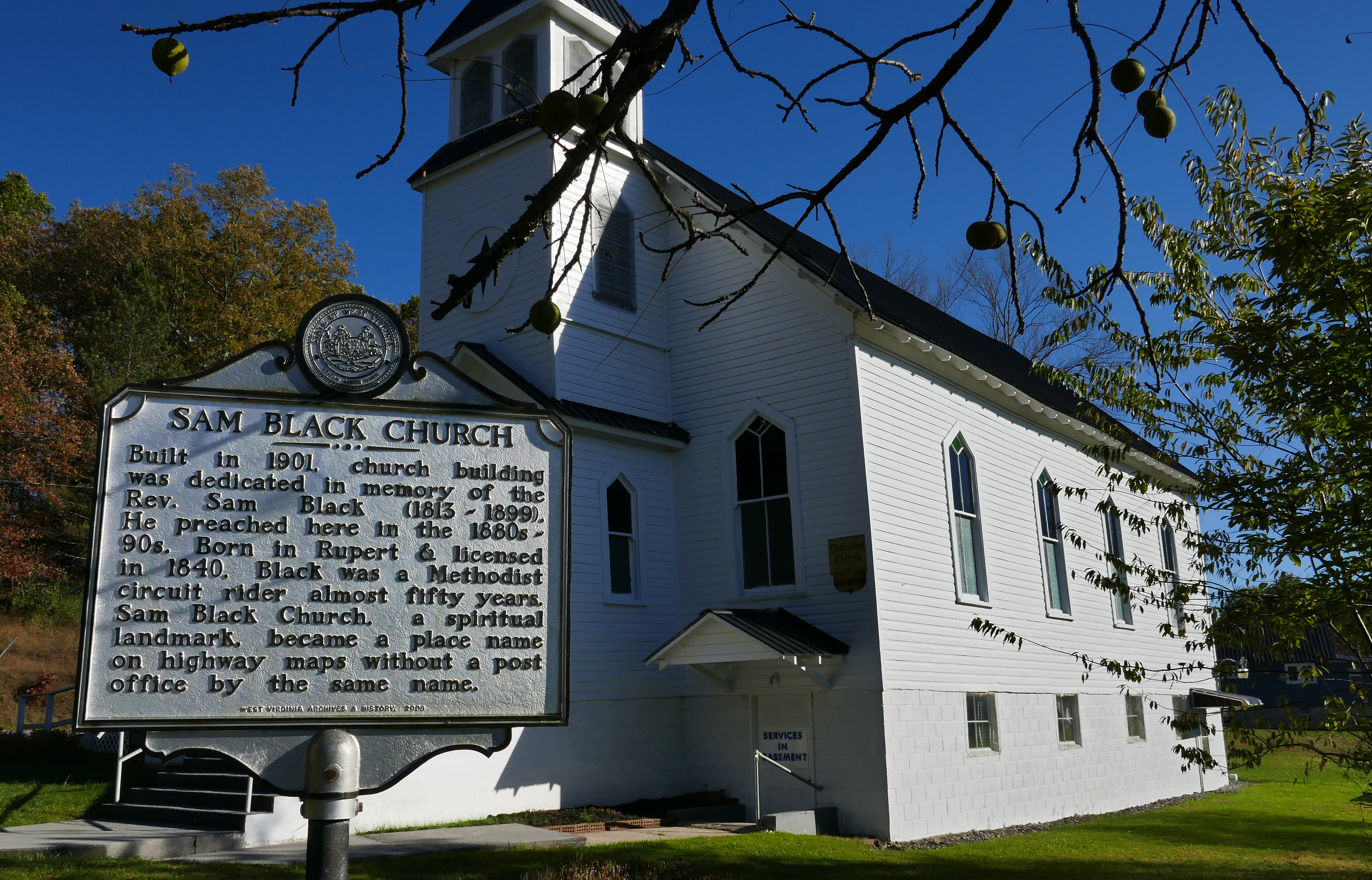
Sam Black Church, 2017

The historic white frame church was built in 1902 and named in honor of Reverend Sam Black, a circuit-riding Southern Methodist preacher who died in 1899. It is a small one story building with a gable roof. It features a square, open bell tower with a hipped roof. It is located at the intersection of Interstate 64 and U.S. Route 60 on the Midland Trail, a National Scenic Byway.

It was listed on the National Register of Historic Places in 1999.
