= Deitz Farm =

Historic house in West Virginia, United States

- U.S. National Register of Historic Places
- U.S. Historic district
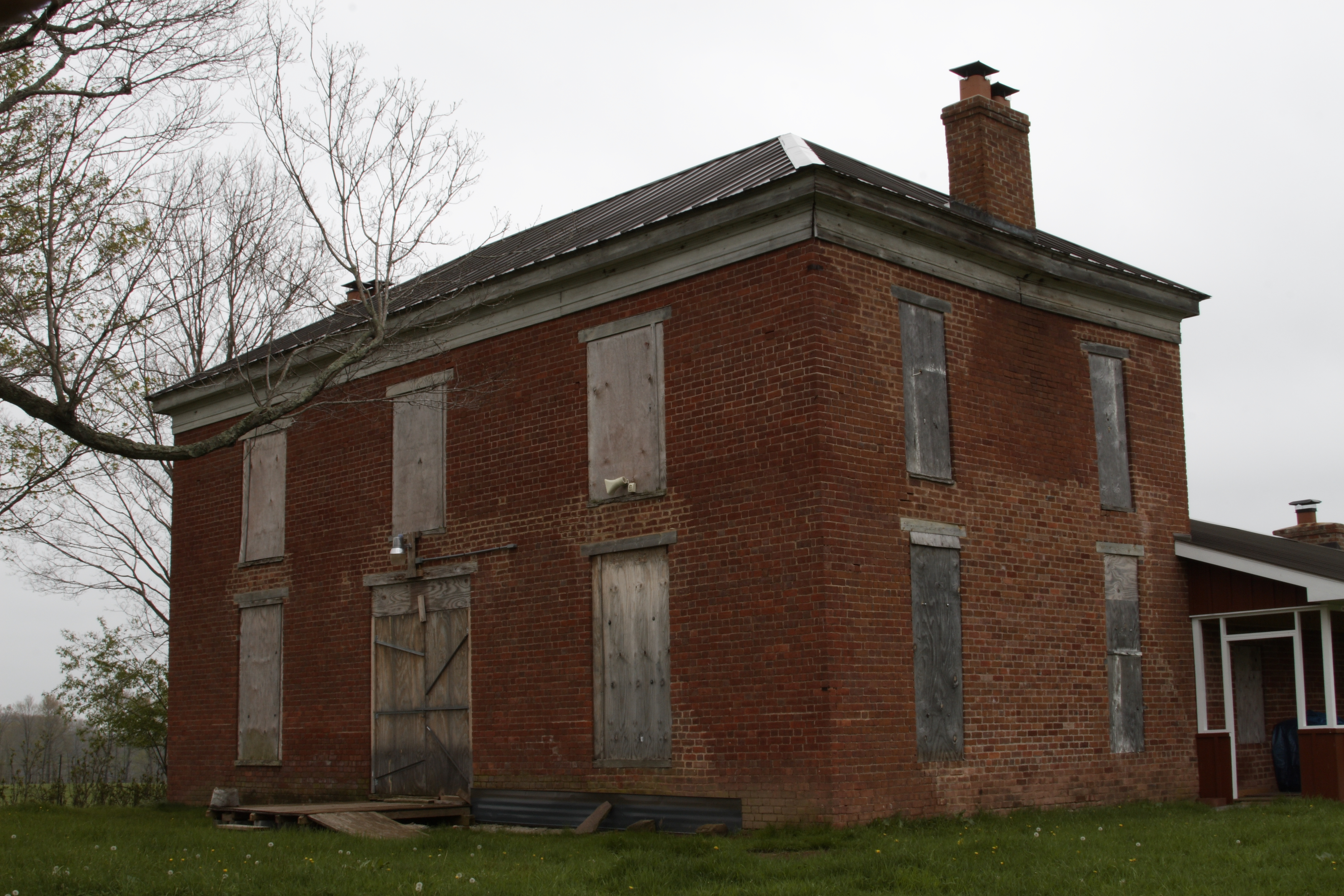

- Location within West Virginia Location within the United States
- Location: Junction of County Routes 28 and 60/32, near Meadow Bluff, West Virginia
- Coordinates: 37°54′34″N 80°40′10″W
- Area: 96 acres (39 ha)
- Built: 1861
- Architectural style: Greek Revival
- NRHP reference No.: 92000304
- Added to NRHP: April 17, 1992

Deitz Farm, also known as General Robert E. Lee Headquarters, is a national historic district located near Meadow Bluff, Greenbrier County, West Virginia. The house was built about 1840, and is a two-story side gabled red brick residence in the Greek Revival style. It features a three bay, one-story wooden porch across the front of the house. Also on the property are two contributing wooden outbuildings and earthworks associated with the property's role as General Robert E. Lee Headquarters during the American Civil War.

The trench-like earthwork were built by the Confederates in 1861. On September 21, 1861, Confederate General Robert E. Lee arrived at Meadow Bluff and assumed command of the Confederate forces then operating in the area under General John B. Floyd. Lee and Floyd occupied the Deitz House as headquarters for two days, at which time he moved his camp to Big Sewell Mountain. Lee returned to the Deitz farm on October 21, remaining until October 29. During the War, the property was used as a camp for both Confederate and Union forces and the house used as a military hospital and command center. In addition, the property contains the burial site of a number of soldiers who died here during the War.

It was listed on the National Register of Historic Places in 1992.
