= State Fair of West Virginia =

Annual state fair

Coordinates: 37.7769°N 80.4608°W

- Genre: State fair
- Dates: 06-15 August 2026
- Locations: Fairlea, West Virginia
- Years active: 1881–1916, 1919–1939; 1946–2019; 2021–
- Website: Official website

The State Fair of West Virginia is an annual state fair for West Virginia, United States. It is held annually in mid-August on the State Fairgrounds in Lewisburg. This year's State Fair is scheduled for 13-22 August 2026. The State Fairgrounds consists of a large open park for carnivals and exhibition, grandstands, and several exhibition buildings. Free parking is provided adjacent to the fairgrounds.

Over the years the following concerts have been held at the grandstand:

• Conway Twitty • Loretta Lynn • George Jones • Merle Haggard • Johnny Cash • Lorrie Morgan • Little Big Town • Britney Spears • Big Time Rush • Victoria Justice • Tammy Wynette • Travis Tritt

At the 2019 State Fair Alabama was scheduled to perform but Randy Owen became ill. Jamey Johnson filled in for Alabama.

The West Virginia State Police, Greenbrier County Sheriff's Office and security guards are the ones who patrol this fair.

== History ==
The first event to be called the State Fair occurred in Wheeling on February 1, 1881. The Lewisburg fair evolved from local events that date back to 1854. World War I caused the 1917 & 1918 fairs to be cancelled. In 1941 the state government declared it to be the official State Fair. However, World War II forced cancellation of the event until 1946. The Meadow River Lumber Building was listed on the National Register of Historic Places in 1997. There was also no fair in 2020 due to the COVID-19 pandemic.

== Current activities ==
By the standards of large states with a more agricultural economies, the West Virginia event is relatively small. It lasts over eight days. It features a traveling carnival with various rides, competitive exhibitions by farmers and 4-H and FFA members, harness racing (no gambling is currently allowed), exhibitions by manufacturers of farm machinery and industrial tools, and a nightly concert performed by popular artists. Higher stakes Bingo is conducted at the fair than is normally permitted under state law. A beauty queen is selected. In political years, elaborate displays by candidates and political parties are also a part of the fair. Midway Rides are provided by the Orange unit of Reithoffer Shows.

The 2006 fair generated 174,438 paid admissions, which was the highest number since 2002; that year, security screens were set up at the gates. Adding children under five (who are admitted free) and various other complementary admissions brings the estimated attendance to 210,000. Prior to the completion of Interstate 64 in 1988 the fairground was difficult to access from most of the state and the event was much more local in nature. However, it has grown greatly since that time.

The Fair is a non-profit organization under section 501(c)(3) of the U.S. Internal Revenue Code. Although the Fair does not release its financial statements to the public, managers claim that it operates on a "small margin." According to a 2006 report commissioned by the Fair, it has an annual economic impact of $8.9 million on Greenbrier County.

The Fair receives no appropriation from the state, supporting itself from admissions, fees charged to vendors, and rental of the fairgrounds to other groups. It does receive support in kind from the state Department of Agriculture and from West Virginia University.
