= Argabrite House =

Historic house in West Virginia, United States

- U.S. National Register of Historic Places
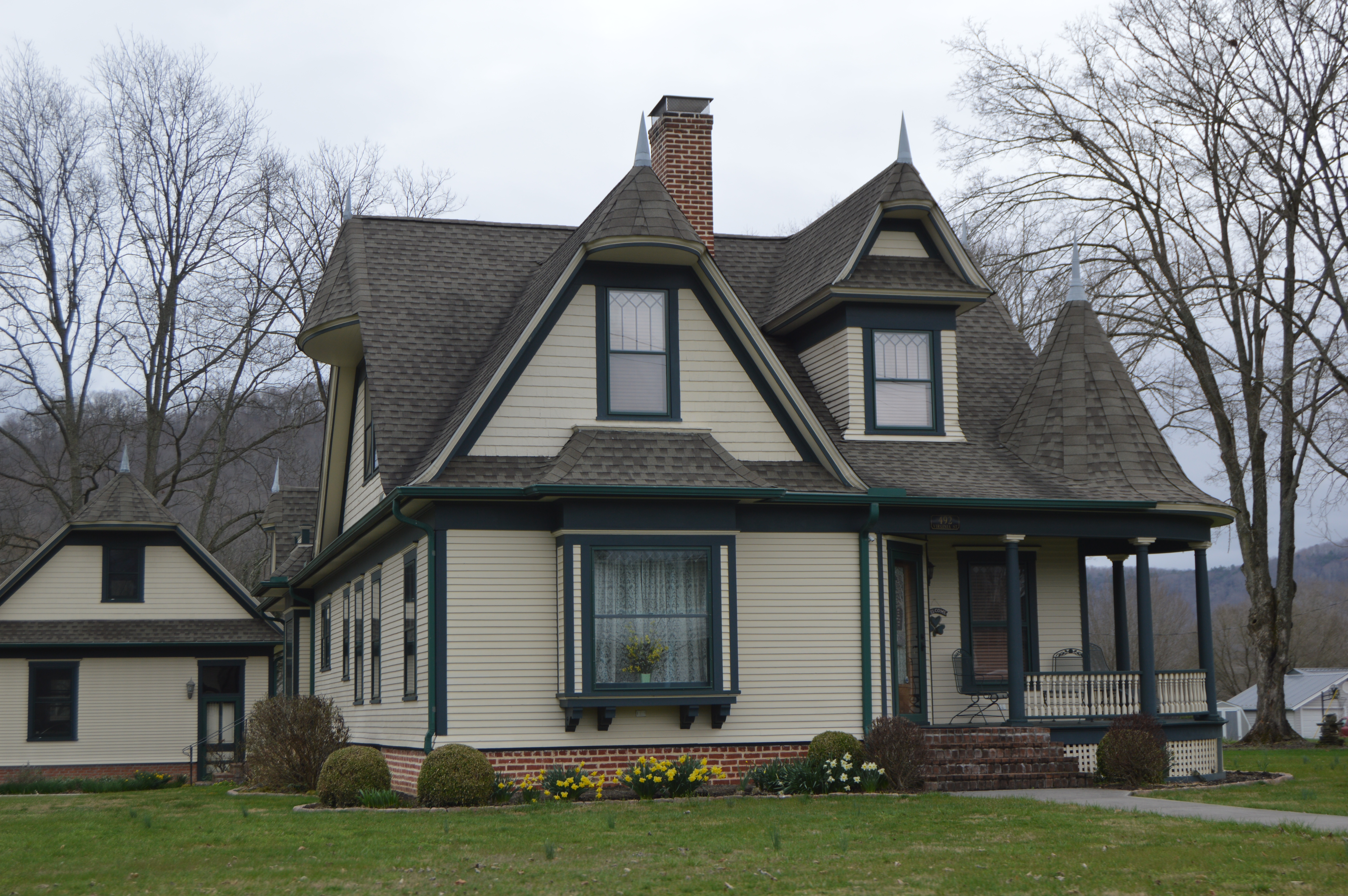
- Front
- Location: Alderson, West Virginia
- Coordinates: 37°43′48″N 80°38′10″W
- Area: 0.8 acres (3,200 m^{2})
- Architect: Jacob H. Daverman & Sons
- Architectural style: Queen Anne
- NRHP reference No.: 08001236
- Added to NRHP: April 16, 2009

The Argabrite House, also known as the Hambrick House, is located at 504 Virginia Street in Alderson, West Virginia, United States. The property, consisting of three contributing buildings, was added to the National Register of Historic Places on April 16, 2009. The Queen Anne style cottage, built in 1908, was designed by the architectural firm of Jacob H. Daverman & Sons. A barn, also built in 1908, and a chicken house, built in 1920 are in excellent condition and are exemplary of domestic structures of the time. The property was the featured listing in the National Park Service's weekly list of April 24, 2009.
