= Morlunda (Greenbrier County, West Virginia) =

Historic house in West Virginia, United States

- U.S. National Register of Historic Places
- Location within West Virginia Location within the United States
- Location: Northwest of Lewisburg on County Route 40, Lewisburg, West Virginia
- Coordinates: 37°49′54″N 80°29′28″W
- Area: 5 acres (2.0 ha)
- Built: 1827
- Built by: John W. Dunn
- NRHP reference No.: 77001374
- Added to NRHP: March 25, 1977

Morlunda, also known as the Col. Samuel McClung Place and Oscar Nelson Farm, is a historic home located near Lewisburg, Greenbrier County, West Virginia. It was built in 1827–1828, and consists of a main house with ell. The main house is a two-story brick building measuring 56 feet long and 21 feet deep. The ell measures 48 feet and it connects to a 1 1/2-story formerly detached kitchen.

It was built during 1827–1828 under direction of contractor and architect John W. Dunn. Interior woodwork was done by wood-carver Conrad Burgess and associates. Burgess and Dunn worked together on a number of houses, including Mountain Home.

The building was listed on the National Register of Historic Places in 1977.
