= McClung's Price Place =

Historic house in West Virginia, United States

- U.S. National Register of Historic Places
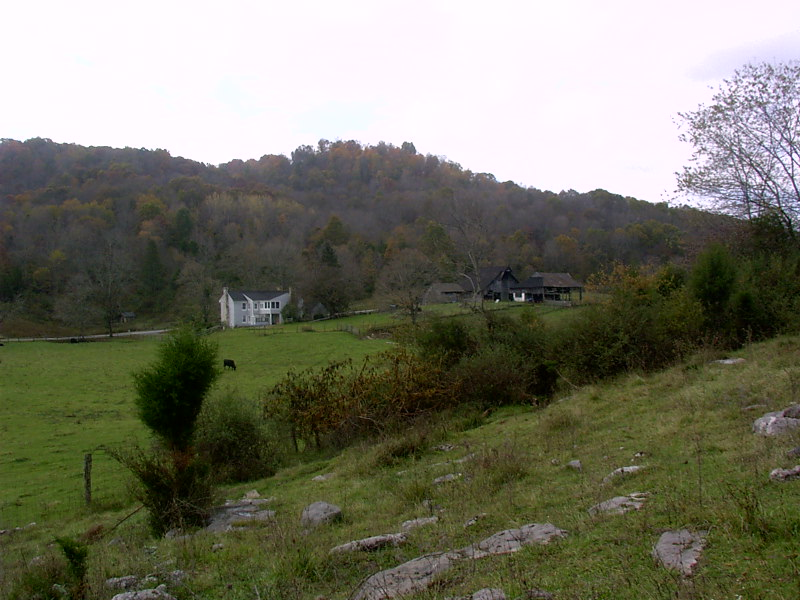
- Hillyrock Farm with the McClung's Price Place in the distance

- Location within West Virginia Location within the United States
- Nearest city: 699 Savannah Ln., Lewisburg, West Virginia
- Coordinates: 37°53′39.2″N 80°24′59.2″W
- Area: 147 acres (59 ha)
- Built: 1800
- Architectural style: Colonial Revival
- NRHP reference No.: 07000782
- Added to NRHP: August 3, 2007

McClung's Price Place, also known as Hillyrock Farm, is a historic home and farm located at Lewisburg, Greenbrier County, West Virginia. The farm has been in continued operation since the early 1800s. During the occupancy of A.P. McClung, the original four room utilitarian log cabin was enlarged to an eight-room house. The property includes barns and other contributing outbuildings.

It was listed on the National Register of Historic Places in 2007.
