= Tuscawilla =

Historic house in West Virginia, United States

- U.S. National Register of Historic Places
- Location within West Virginia Location within the United States
- Location: South of Lewisburg off U.S. Route 219, near Lewisburg, West Virginia
- Coordinates: 37°47′0″N 80°27′0″W
- Area: 3 acres (1.2 ha)
- Built: 1844
- Built by: Dunn, John W.
- Architectural style: Classical Revival, Federal
- NRHP reference No.: 79002576
- Added to NRHP: December 19, 1979

Tuscawilla, also known as Knight Farm and Edward Dana Knight Farm, is a historic home located near Lewisburg, Greenbrier County, West Virginia. It was built in 1844, and is an L-shaped brick house with a five-bay front facing west. The facade has both Federal and Neo-Classical design elements. It features a one-story portico with modified Doric order columns centered at the front elevation. Several additions were made to the house after 1920.

It was built by John W. Dunn, "a noted contractor-architect" of the Greenbrier Valley region, and "is viewed as among the most significant houses" of the region.

It was listed on the National Register of Historic Places in 1979.
