= Edgefield (Renick, West Virginia) =

- U.S. National Register of Historic Places
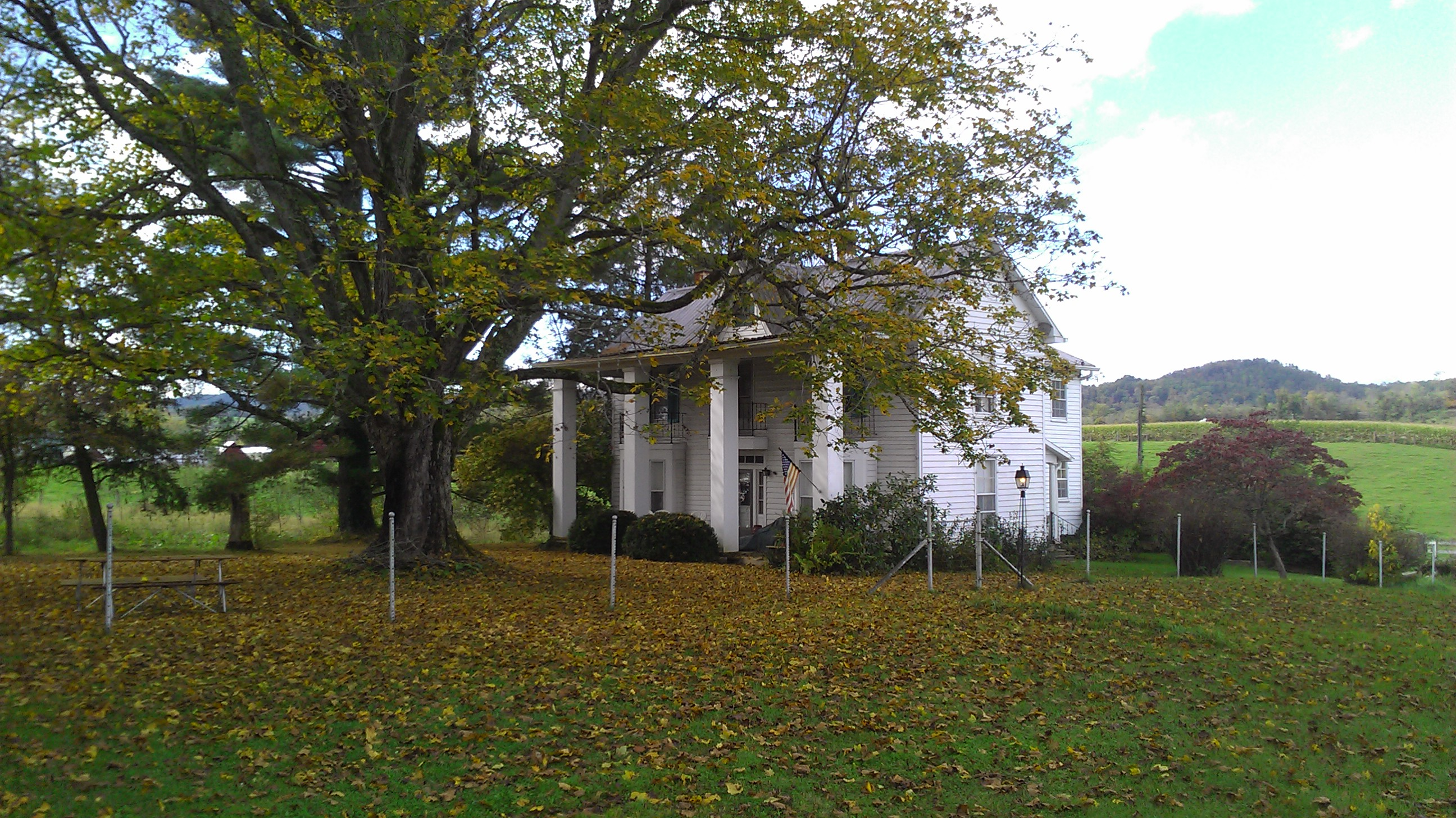

- Location within West Virginia Location within the United States
- Location: 461 Brownstown Rd., Renick, West Virginia
- Coordinates: 37°59′47″N 80°21′21″W
- Area: 91 acres (37 ha)
- Built: c. 1897
- Architectural style: Classical Revival
- NRHP reference No.: 12001047
- Added to NRHP: December 12, 2012

Edgefield is a historic home and farm complex located at Renick, Greenbrier County, West Virginia. The Edgefield House is a frame, two-story, three-bay building with a side gable roof. It has a two-story ell with an asymmetrical gabled roof. The front facade is dominated by a full-height (two-story) open porch supported by four large square columns. Also on the property are the contributing coal shed, meat house, cistern, granary, machine shed, and two barns. Between 1935 and 1960, Floy Whiting Whorrell (a daughter of G. W. Whiting), a widow operated (and later owned) the farm.

It was listed on the National Register of Historic Places in 2012.
