= David S. Creigh House =

Historic house in West Virginia, United States

- U.S. National Register of Historic Places
- Location within West Virginia Location within the United States
- Location: Southwest of Lewisburg off the Davis-Stuart Rd., near Lewisburg, West Virginia
- Coordinates: 37°46′14″N 80°28′33″W
- Area: 1 acre (0.40 ha)
- Built: 1834; 192 years ago
- Architect: John W. Dunn
- Architectural style: Greek Revival
- NRHP reference No.: 75001888
- Added to NRHP: November 12, 1975

David S. Creigh House, also known as the "Montescena" and Boone Farm, is a historic home located near Lewisburg, Greenbrier County, West Virginia. Although the house has "outstanding architectural features", it is most known for being the site of the 1863 death of a Union soldier which led to the execution of David S. Creigh, the owner, in 1864.

The house was built for Creigh in 1834, and is a 2 1/2-story, brick rectangular residence. The original Greek Revival style portico has been changed twice. It now features a deep, two-story porch supported by six large, wooden columns. The front facade also has the two dormers with Palladian windows.

The house may have been designed by architect John W. Dunn, a friend of Creigh. Creigh, in the house, apparently killed a Union soldier, and was eventually sentenced to hang. Dunn sought to speak in support of Creigh but was not allowed. Part of the punishment was that the house would be burned, but that was not carried out.

The house was listed on the National Register of Historic Places in 1975.
