= John Wesley Methodist Church =

Historic church in West Virginia, United States

- U.S. National Register of Historic Places
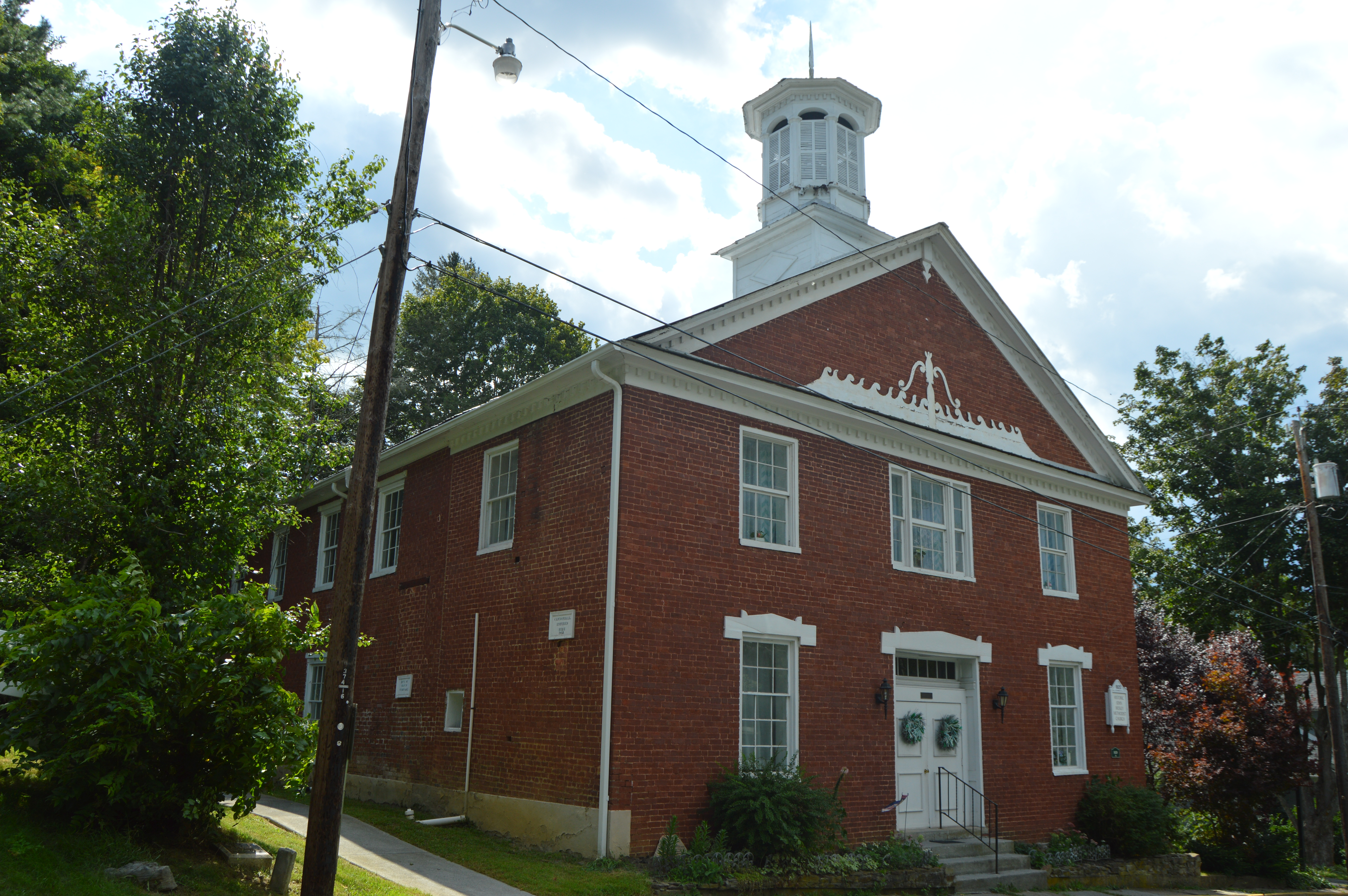
- Front and eastern side

- Location within West Virginia Location within the United States
- Location: E. Foster St., Lewisburg, West Virginia
- Coordinates: 37°47′59″N 80°26′40″W
- Area: 0.5 acres (0.20 ha)
- Built: 1820
- Architect: Weir, John; Dunn, John W.
- Architectural style: Greek Revival
- NRHP reference No.: 74001997
- Added to NRHP: June 5, 1974

John Wesley Methodist Church, also known as First Methodist Church, is a historic Methodist church on E. Foster Street in Lewisburg, Greenbrier County, West Virginia. It was built in 1820, and is a two-story, brick meeting house building with Greek Revival style design elements. It originally measures 58 feet long by 47 feet wide. In 1835, a vestibule addition added 10 feet to the length. The interior features a "slave gallery." During the Battle of Lewisburg, a cannonball struck the southwest corner and the repairs remain visible.

John Weir, a brickmason and architect, is traditionally accepted to have been the architect for the 1820 building. An 1835 addition was by John W. Dunn, also a brickmason and architect. Dunn is credited with bringing Greek Revival architecture to the area by this work. According to the 1974 NRHP nomination, the building "remains one of the county's most stately structures".

It was listed on the National Register of Historic Places in 1974.
