= Mt. Tabor Baptist Church =

Historic church in West Virginia, United States

- U.S. National Register of Historic Places
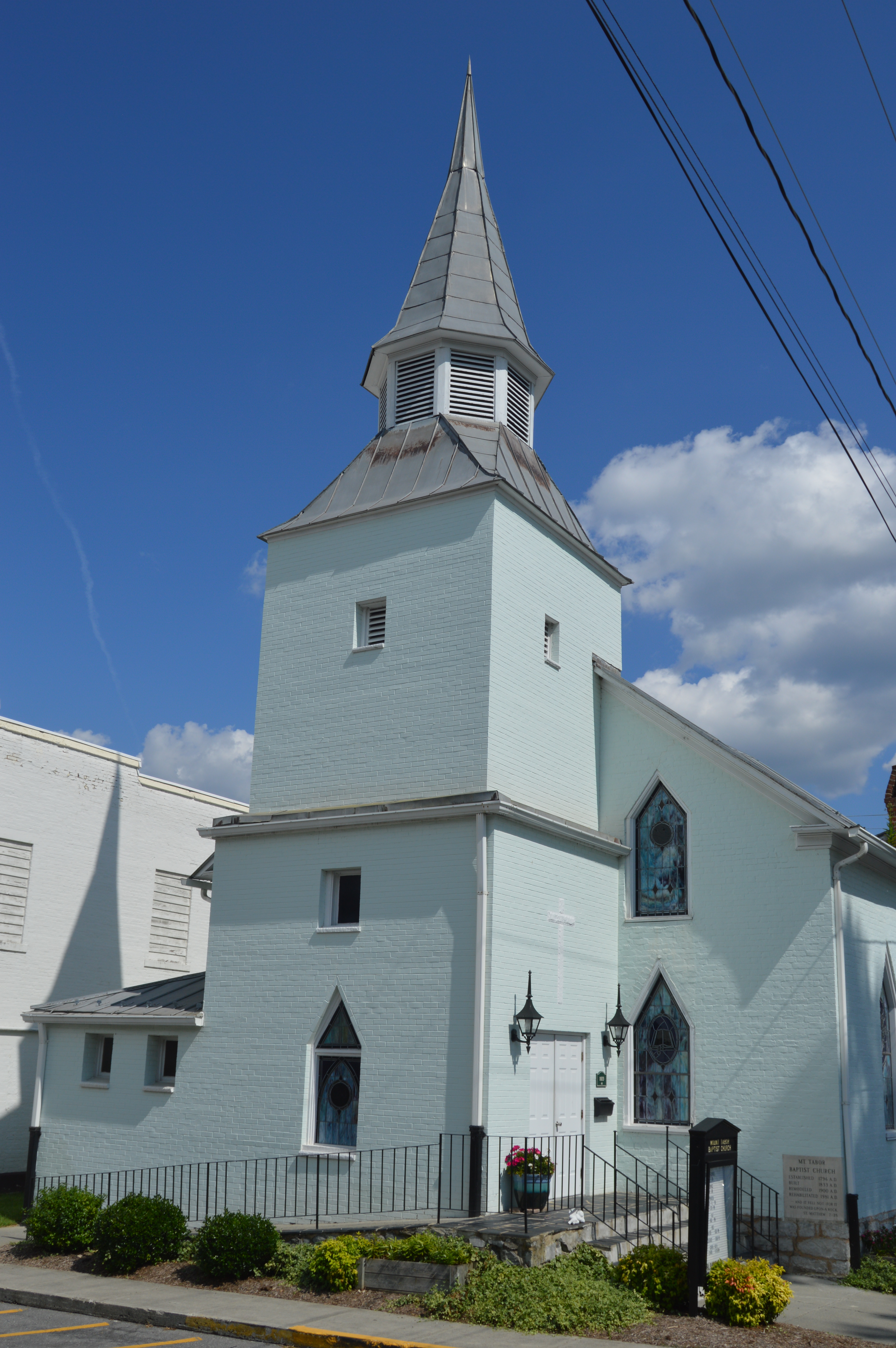
- Front of the church

- Location within West Virginia Location within the United States
- Location: Court and Foster Sts., Lewisburg, West Virginia
- Coordinates: 37°48′6.5″N 80°26′50″W
- Area: 1 acre (0.40 ha)
- Built: 1832
- Architectural style: Gothic
- NRHP reference No.: 76001934
- Added to NRHP: December 12, 1976

Mt. Tabor Baptist Church, also known as Big Levels Baptist Church, Lewisburg Baptist Church, and Mount Tabor Church, is a historic Baptist church at Court and Foster Streets in Lewisburg, Greenbrier County, West Virginia. It was built in 1832, and is a 1 1/2-story, brick meeting house building with Gothic style design elements. It measures 36 feet long by 40 feet wide and sits on a thick limestone foundation. It features a 10 feet by 16 feet frame tower, topped with an octagonal cap and belfry.

It was listed on the National Register of Historic Places in 1976.
