= Greenbrier County Courthouse =

- Greenbrier County Courthouse and Lewis Spring
- U.S. National Register of Historic Places
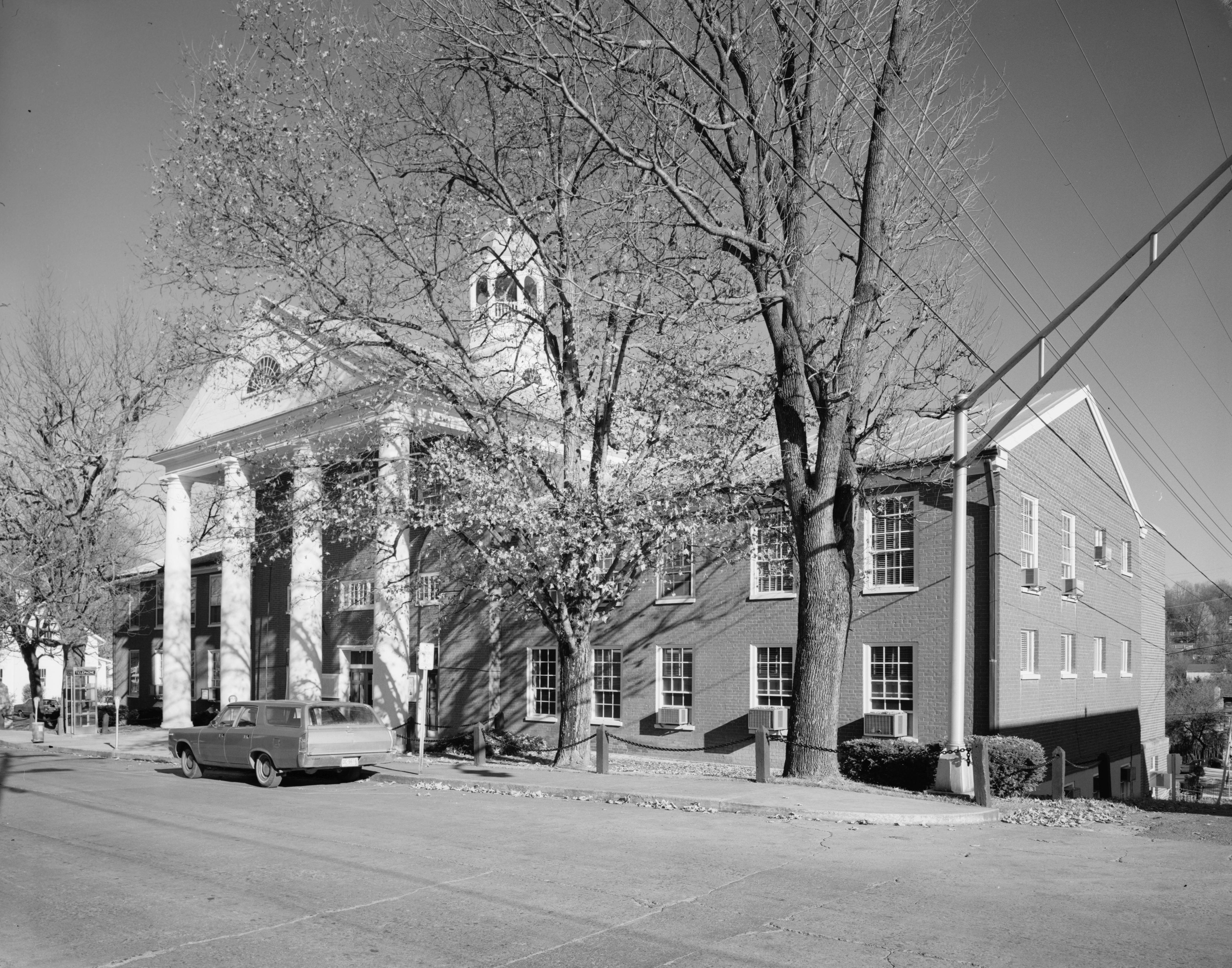
- Greenbrier County Courthouse, 1974

- Location within West Virginia Location within the United States
- Location: Corner of Court and Randolph Sts., Lewisburg, West Virginia
- Coordinates: 37°48′11″N 80°26′46″W
- Area: 1 acre (0.40 ha)
- Built: 1837
- Built by: John W. Dunn
- Architectural style: T shape
- NRHP reference No.: 73001900
- Added to NRHP: August 17, 1973

Greenbrier County Courthouse is a historic courthouse building located at Lewisburg, Greenbrier County, West Virginia. In 1973 the courthouse and the adjacent spring house, the Lewis Spring, were listed on the National Register of Historic Places.

The courthouse was built in 1837, and is a two-three story, T-shaped brick building. The front facade features four large plastered brick columns. Atop the building is a cupola belfry. The Lewis Spring is enclosed in a small, well-preserved stone building. Adjacent is a high stone retaining wall constructed between 1785–1795.

The courthouse building was built from local brick by mason John W. Dunn (who was also an architect, but is not credited with the courthouse's design).
