= Governor Samuel Price House =

Historic house in West Virginia, United States

- Gov. Samuel Price House
- U.S. National Register of Historic Places
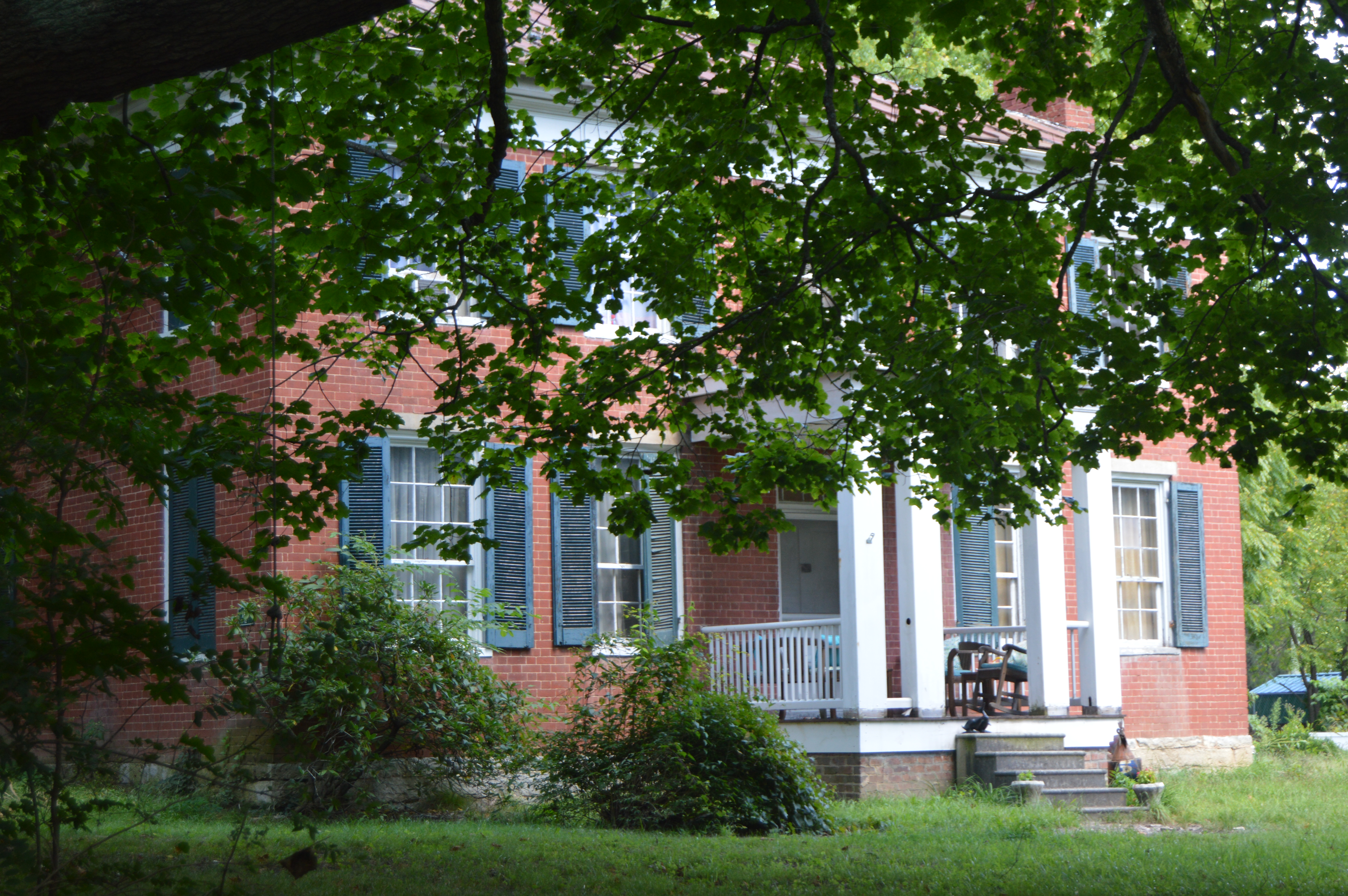
- Front of the house

- Location within West Virginia Location within the United States
- Location: 224 N. Court St., Lewisburg, West Virginia
- Coordinates: 37°48′15″N 80°26′39″W
- Area: 1 acre (0.40 ha)
- Built: c. 1830
- Architectural style: Greek Revival
- NRHP reference No.: 75001890
- Added to NRHP: June 20, 1975

The Governor Samuel Price House, also known as the Preston House, is a historic home located at Lewisburg, Greenbrier County, West Virginia. It was the residence of Samuel Price. It was built in the 1830s, and is a two-story brick dwelling on a cut stone foundation, with a rectangular main section and ell on the western side. It has a hipped roof on the main section and gable roof on the ell. Also on the property are two brick octagonal dependencies; a bath and a smokehouse.

It was listed on the National Register of Historic Places in 1975.
