= Smoot, West Virginia =

- Unincorporated community
- Location within the state of West Virginia Smoot (the United States)
- Coordinates: 37°52′43″N 80°39′32″W
- Country: United States
- State: West Virginia
- County: Greenbrier
- Time zone: UTC-5 (Eastern (EST))
  - Summer (DST): UTC-4 (EDT)
- ZIP codes: 24977

Smoot is an unincorporated community in western Greenbrier County, West Virginia, United States. It lies south of the interchange of Interstate 64 and U.S. Route 60, northwest of the city of Lewisburg, the county seat of Greenbrier County. Its elevation is 2,480 feet (756 m). It has a post office with the ZIP code 24977.

The community was named after E. D. Smoot, who was credited with securing a post office for the town.
