= Caldwell, West Virginia =

Unincorporated community in West Virginia, United States

- Unincorporated community
- Location within West Virginia Location within the United States
- Coordinates: 37°46′50″N 80°23′38″W
- Country: United States
- State: West Virginia
- County: Greenbrier
- Elevation: 1,696 ft (517 m)

Population (2020)
  - Total: 489
  - Density: 14/sq mi (5.4/km^{2})
- Time zone: UTC-5 (Eastern (EST))
  - Summer (DST): UTC-4 (EDT)
- ZIP code: 24925
- Area codes: 304 & 681
- GNIS feature ID: 1554050

Caldwell is an unincorporated community in Greenbrier County, West Virginia, United States. Caldwell is located on U.S. Route 60, 3 miles (4.8 km) southeast of Lewisburg. The population was 489 at the 2020 Census. Caldwell has a post office with ZIP code 24925.

The community has the name of James R. Caldwell, the original owner of the town site.
