= Old Stone Church (Lewisburg, West Virginia) =

Historic church in West Virginia, United States

- U.S. National Register of Historic Places
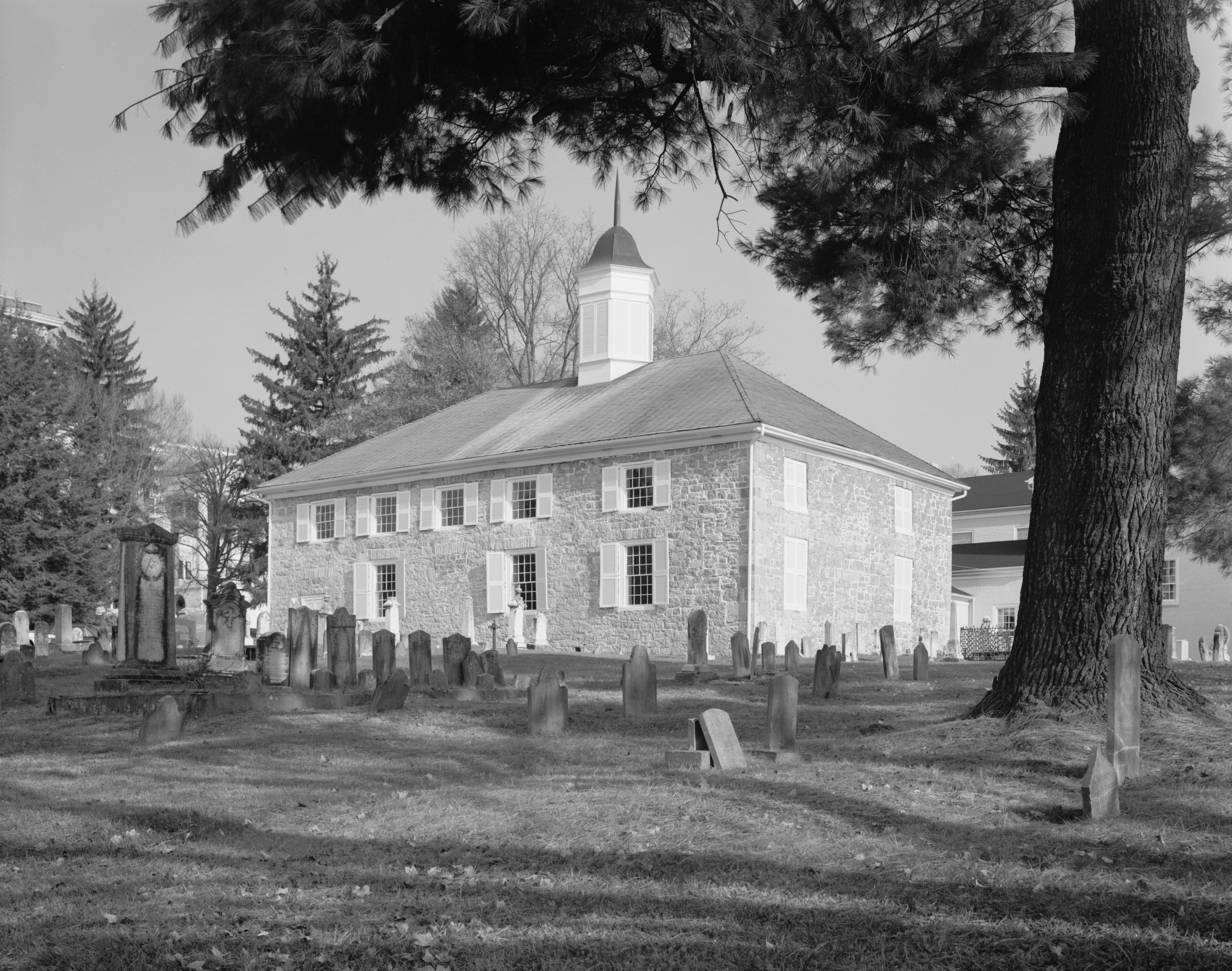
- Old Stone Church, November 1974

- Location within West Virginia Location within the United States
- Location: 644 Church St., Lewisburg, West Virginia
- Coordinates: 37.8016°N 80.4483°W
- Area: 2 acres (0.81 ha)
- Built: 1796
- Architectural style: Old Virginia
- NRHP reference No.: 72001286
- Added to NRHP: February 23, 1972

Old Stone Church is a historic Presbyterian church located at Lewisburg, Greenbrier County, West Virginia. Founded in 1796, it is the oldest church building in continuous use west of the Alleghenies.

== History ==
In 1783, Rev. John McCue arrived in what became Greenbrier Country of West Virginia. He found fifteen or twenty Presbyterians worshiping in a log house erected on land belonging to Rev. Jacob Osborne, probably the first Presbyterian minister in this section. Rev. McCue organized the church of Fort Union, which name was shortly changed to Lewisburg in honor of Col. Andrew Lewis. Rev. McCue also organized the churches of Spring Creek and Union or "Good Hope," thereafter called "the three cornerstones of Presbyterianism" in this section.

In 1792, Rev. Benjamin P. Grigsby succeeded Mr. McCue as pastor. The Old Stone church was built in 1796 under Grigsby's pastorate. Then occurred the first mention of a woman's Christian service, within the bounds of the Synod of West Virginia. Mrs. Agnes Stuart (nee Agnes Lewis, of the line of Col. Andrew Lewis), wife of Col. John Stuart, was the principal subscriber to this building, she and her brother, Colonel Lewis, giving US$2,500. No doubt this woman's interest inspired others who gave assistance in other ways. Her husband, having already liberally subscribed, gave the land on which the church was built, and being an artisan in stone work, he engraved a stone which was placed over the front entrance. Mr. Grigsby went back to Eastern Virginia shortly after the erection of the church and there was a vacancy for ten years.

Rev. John McElhenny came in 1808, and served the church for over sixty years starting in 1808. When he began his work, the church was very weak and years after, his granddaughter writes of having heard him refer to his early work at Union and Lewisburg, and says that he would have given up in utter despair but for the sense of the fact that there were a number of pious women, mothers and wives, in his church, whose prayers were for a revival, and for the conversion of their husbands and sons. This revival came after a slow growth of twenty years, when between ninety and a hundred were added to the church roll, and gave it an impetus forward.

During the American Civil War, it served as a hospital for both Union and Confederate forces. The pews of the church were removed so that more cots for soldiers could be brought in. After the Union victory at the Battle of Lewisburg, a trench was built by the side of the church to bury the Confederate dead. After the war, the soldiers were reburied at the Confederate Cemetery at Lewisburg.

In 1872, the "Ladies' Foreign Missionary Society" of the Old Stone Church, was organized and a daughter of Rev. McElhenny, Mrs. Elizabeth Fry, was the first President and Mrs Susan Estill, Treasurer.

It was listed on the National Register of Historic Places in 1976. The related Stone Manse was listed on the National Register of Historic Places in 2004.

== Architecture and fittings ==
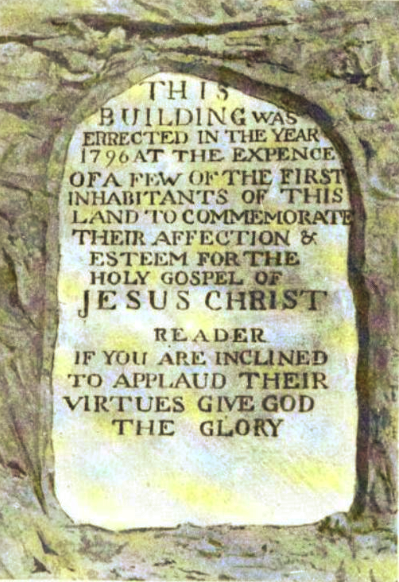
Stone engraving

A two-story, rectangular building was constructed in 1796. This building was made of native limestone, gathered from the nearby land, and placed in the walls in their original shape and size. Tradition states that when the stones of this building were collected, the women and boys carried the sand in sacks, on horses, from Greenbrier River, a distance of 4 miles (6.4 km), to make the mortar to build this stone edifice.

An addition was constructed in 1830, making the building 75 by 44 feet (23 m × 13 m) in size. It features an open cupola belfry.

== Burials ==
- Henry M. Mathews, Governor of West Virginia
- wife and son of musician T. M. Turner
