= Fairlea, West Virginia =

- Census-designated place (CDP)
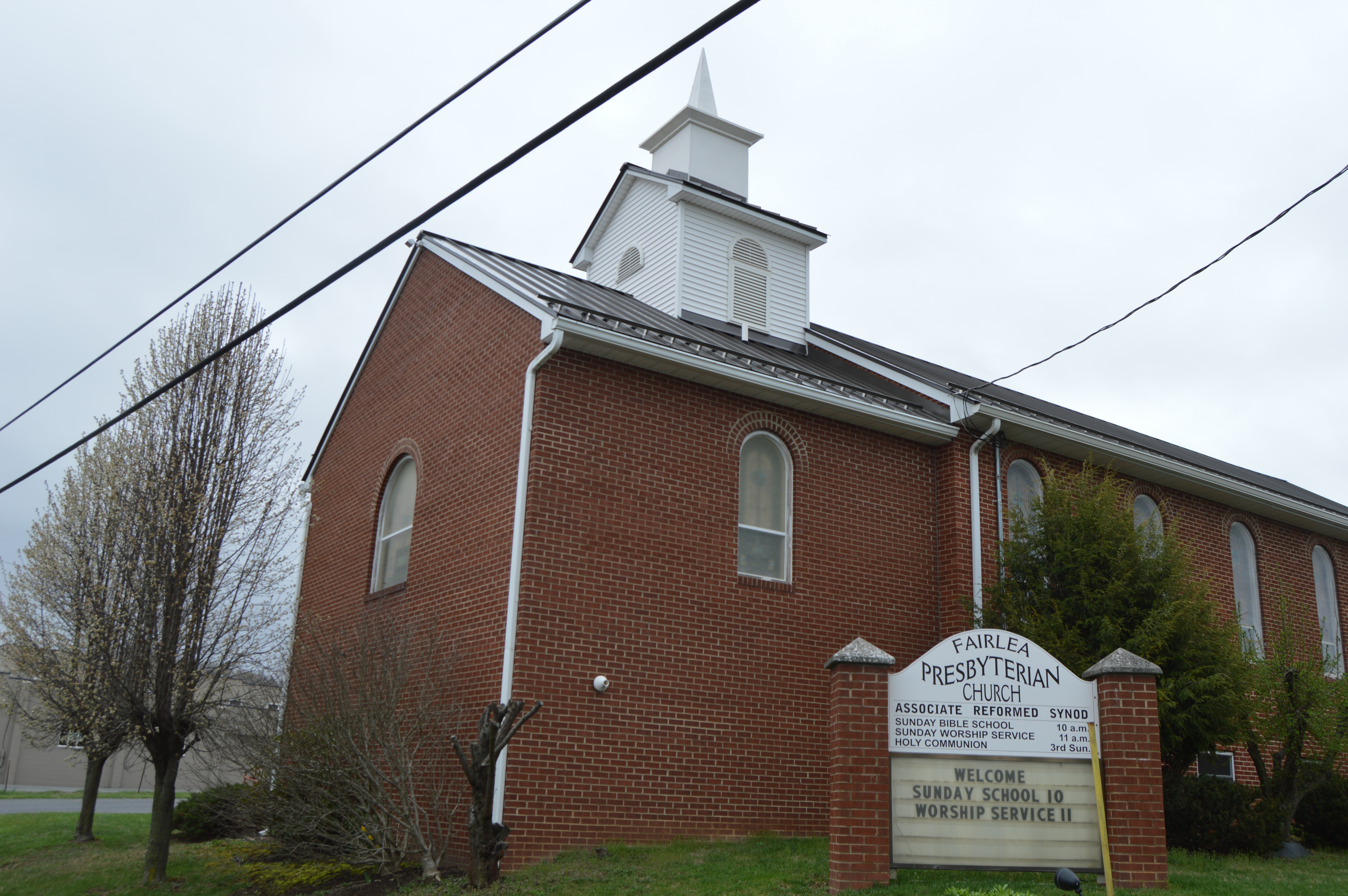
- Associate Reformed Presbyterian Church on U.S. Route 219

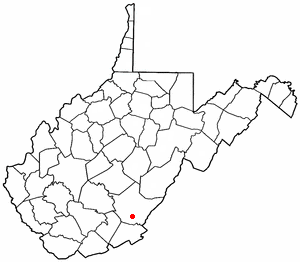
- Location of Fairlea, West Virginia
- Coordinates: 37°46′32″N 80°27′29″W
- Country: United States
- State: West Virginia
- County: Greenbrier

Area
  - Total: 3.7 sq mi (9.6 km^{2})
  - Land: 3.7 sq mi (9.6 km^{2})
  - Water: 0 sq mi (0.0 km^{2})
- Elevation: 2,159 ft (658 m)

Population (2020)
  - Total: 1,720
  - Density: 460/sq mi (180/km^{2})
- Time zone: UTC-5 (Eastern (EST))
  - Summer (DST): UTC-4 (EDT)
- ZIP code: 24902
- Area code: 304
- FIPS code: 54-26428
- GNIS feature ID: 2389062

Fairlea is a census-designated place (CDP) in Greenbrier County, West Virginia, United States. The population was 1,720 at the 2020 census (slightly down from 1,747 at the 2010 census). Fairlea is the location of the annual West Virginia State Fair, held in August.

== Geography ==
Fairlea is located at 37°46′48″N 80°27′31″W (37.779967, -80.458538).

According to the United States Census Bureau, the CDP has a total area of 3.7 square miles (9.6 km^{2}), all land.

The area Fairlea is located on is relatively flat compared to the rest of the state.

It borders the city of Lewisburg to the north, and the city of Ronceverte to the south.

== Demographics ==
As of the census of 2000, there were 1,706 people, 770 households, and 428 families residing in the CDP. The population density was 461.8 people per square mile (178.5/km^{2}). There were 861 housing units at an average density of 233.1/sq mi (90.1/km^{2}). The racial makeup of the CDP was 96.66% White, 1.17% African American, 0.12% Native American, 0.76% Asian, 0.35% from other races, and 0.94% from two or more races. Hispanic or Latino of any race were 1.41% of the population.

There were 770 households, out of which 24.0% had children under the age of 18 living with them, 42.5% were married couples living together, 10.5% had a female householder with no husband present, and 44.4% were non-families. 39.4% of all households were made up of individuals, and 15.8% had someone living alone who was 65 years of age or older. The average household size was 2.08 and the average family size was 2.78.

In the CDP, the population was spread out, with 19.0% under the age of 18, 9.0% from 18 to 24, 27.3% from 25 to 44, 23.2% from 45 to 64, and 21.5% who were 65 years of age or older. The median age was 41 years. For every 100 females, there were 85.0 males. For every 100 females age 18 and over, there were 79.7 males.

The median income for a household in the CDP was $20,664, and the median income for a family was $28,077. Males had a median income of $20,625 versus $22,281 for females. The per capita income for the CDP was $16,146. About 22.0% of families and 27.4% of the population were below the poverty line, including 44.9% of those under age 18 and 21.0% of those age 65 or over.

== Transportation ==
=== Major highways ===
- U.S. 219
