= Alvon, West Virginia =

Unincorporated community in West Virginia, United States

- Unincorporated community
- Location within West Virginia Location within the United States
- Coordinates: 37°54′18″N 80°12′51″W
- Country: United States
- State: West Virginia
- County: Greenbrier
- Elevation: 2,005 ft (611 m)
- Time zone: UTC-5 (Eastern (EST))
  - Summer (DST): UTC-4 (EDT)
- Area codes: 304 & 681
- GNIS feature ID: 1550101

Alvon is an unincorporated community in Greenbrier County, West Virginia, United States. Alvon is located on West Virginia Route 92, 9 miles (14 km) northeast of White Sulphur Springs.
