= Falling Spring, West Virginia =

Falling Spring, West Virginia Renick
- Town
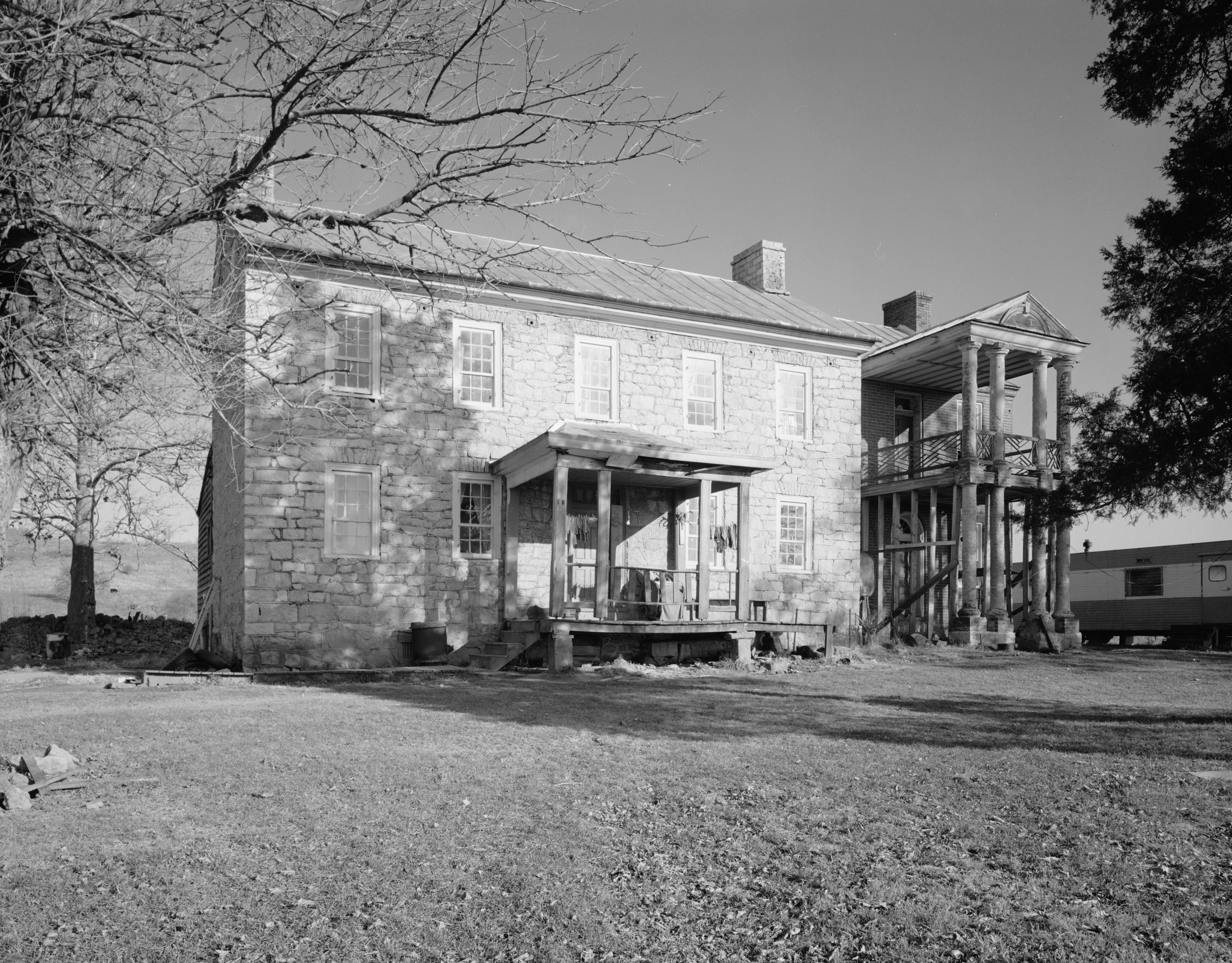
- Renick Farmhouse which is located south of Renick

- Location of Falling Spring in Greenbrier County, West Virginia.
- Coordinates: 37°59′34″N 80°21′27″W
- Country: United States
- State: West Virginia
- County: Greenbrier
- Established: 1769

Government
  - Mayor: Patrick Roberts
  - City Recorder: Melinda L. Workman
  - Fire Dept. Chief: Robert Harvey Jr.

Area
  - Total: 0.53 sq mi (1.37 km^{2})
  - Land: 0.51 sq mi (1.33 km^{2})
  - Water: 0.012 sq mi (0.03 km^{2})
- Elevation: 2,087 ft (636 m)

Population (2020)
  - Total: 170
  - Estimate (2021): 168
  - Density: 392.3/sq mi (151.46/km^{2})
- Time zone: UTC-5 (Eastern (EST))
  - Summer (DST): UTC-4 (EDT)
- ZIP Code: 24966 (Renick)
- Area code: 304
- FIPS code: 54-26692
- GNIS feature ID: 2390175

Falling Spring is a town in Greenbrier County, West Virginia, United States. It is also known as Renick from the name of its post office (ZIP Code 24966). The population was 171 at the 2020 census.

== History ==
In 1769, Major William Renick from Augusta County, Virginia, settled on an entry of 1,000 acres (400 ha) in the northern area of Greenbrier County, an area 16 miles (26 km) north of Lewisburg known as Falling Spring.

Spring Creek Presbyterian Church was established in 1783. The first pastor was Rev. John McCue. The original site of the church was in Spring Creek, about 2.5 miles (4.0 km) south of Renick.

A school was established in the town in 1796. In 1928 the public school system established Renick High School in what is now the Renick Junior High School building.

The Chesapeake and Ohio Railway was built through the center of town around 1900, following the Greenbrier River. In 1901, Pitts and Colley built a large store next to the railroad depot and many businesses followed. The railroad line is now the Greenbrier River Trail.

The Bank of Renick was established in 1909 with the Rev. J.S. Wickline as the first and only president. The bank at one time was considered one of the best banks in the Greenbrier Valley.

The post office of Falling Spring was established in the early part of the 1800s. The post office's name was changed to "Renick" in 1913 by the postal service, due to confusion with the mail service with the community of Falling Spring, Virginia. Today, the post office is still in service and delivers mail not only to the town of Falling Spring, but to the surrounding communities of Auto and Friars Hill.

== Geography ==
According to the United States Census Bureau, the town has a total area of 0.53 square miles (1.37 km^{2}), of which 0.52 square miles (1.35 km^{2}) is land and 0.01 square miles (0.03 km^{2}) is water.

=== Climate ===
The climate in this area is characterized by hot, humid summers and generally mild to cool winters. According to the Köppen Climate Classification system, Renick has a humid subtropical climate, abbreviated "Cfa" on climate maps.

== Government ==
In February 1924, the town of Renick became incorporated with the first meeting of Renick Town Council and consisted of a mayor, recorder, and five council members. The town council meets once a month with elections held every four years for members who each serve a four-year term.

== Demographics ==
Historical population
Census	Pop.	Note	%±
1910	270		—
1920	263		−2.6%
1930	355		35.0%
1940	388		9.3%
1950	307		−20.9%
1960	265		−13.7%
1970	255		−3.8%
1980	240		−5.9%
1990	191		−20.4%
2000	209		9.4%
2010	211		1.0%
2020	170		−19.4%
2021 (est.)	168	▼	−1.2%
U.S. Decennial Census

=== 2010 census ===
As of the census of 2010, there were 211 people, 82 households, and 61 families living in the town. The population density was 405.8 inhabitants per square mile (156.7/km^{2}). There were 106 housing units at an average density of 203.8 per square mile (78.7/km^{2}). The racial makeup of the town was 94.3% White, 0.5% African American, 0.5% Native American, 0.9% from other races, and 3.8% from two or more races. Hispanic or Latino of any race were 0.9% of the population.

There were 82 households, of which 28.0% had children under the age of 18 living with them, 61.0% were married couples living together, 8.5% had a female householder with no husband present, 4.9% had a male householder with no wife present, and 25.6% were non-families. 18.3% of all households were made up of individuals, and 9.8% had someone living alone who was 65 years of age or older. The average household size was 2.57 and the average family size was 2.92.

The median age in the town was 41.5 years. 22.7% of residents were under the age of 18; 8% were between the ages of 18 and 24; 24.2% were from 25 to 44; 33.2% were from 45 to 64; and 11.8% were 65 years of age or older. The gender makeup of the town was 46.0% male and 54.0% female.

=== 2000 census ===
As of the census of 2000, there were 209 people, 85 households, and 57 families living in the town. The population density was 411.1 people per square mile (158.2/km^{2}). There were 113 housing units at an average density of 222.2 per square mile (85.5/km^{2}). The racial makeup of the town was 100.00% White. Hispanic or Latino of any race were 0.48% of the population.

There were 85 households, out of which 29.4% had children under the age of 18 living with them, 57.6% were married couples living together, 5.9% had a female householder with no husband present, and 32.9% were non-families. 27.1% of all households were made up of individuals, and 14.1% had someone living alone who was 65 years of age or older. The average household size was 2.46 and the average family size was 3.00.

In the town, the population was spread out, with 21.1% under the age of 18, 10.0% from 18 to 24, 26.8% from 25 to 44, 23.0% from 45 to 64, and 19.1% who were 65 years of age or older. The median age was 40 years. For every 100 females, there were 101.0 males. For every 100 females age 18 and over, there were 108.9 males.

The median income for a household in the town was $25,469, and the median income for a family was $25,750. Males had a median income of $23,500 versus $20,000 for females. The per capita income for the town was $10,721. About 23.6% of families and 24.9% of the population were below the poverty line, including 43.1% of those under the age of eighteen and 5.1% of those 65 or over.
