= Sims, West Virginia =

- Unincorporated community
- Location within West Virginia Location within the United States
- Coordinates: 37°56′36″N 80°48′06″W
- Country: United States
- State: West Virginia
- County: Greenbrier
- Elevation: 2,425 ft (739 m)
- Time zone: UTC-5 (Eastern (EST))
  - Summer (DST): UTC-4 (EDT)
- Area codes: 304 & 681
- GNIS feature ID: 1555630

Sims is an unincorporated community in Greenbrier County, West Virginia, United States. Sims is located along West Virginia Route 20, 2.5 miles (4.0 km) southwest of Rainelle.
