= Rock Cliff, West Virginia =

- Unincorporated community
- Location within West Virginia Location within the United States
- Coordinates: 37°57′49″N 80°37′26″W
- Country: United States
- State: West Virginia
- County: Greenbrier
- Elevation: 2,881 ft (878 m)
- Time zone: UTC-5 (Eastern (EST))
  - Summer (DST): UTC-4 (EDT)
- Area codes: 304 & 681
- GNIS feature ID: 1555499

Rock Cliff is an unincorporated community in Greenbrier County, West Virginia, United States. Rock Cliff is 3.5 miles (5.6 km) east of Rupert.
