= Meadow River Wildlife Management Area =

State Wildlife Management Area in Greenbrier County, West Virginia

- IUCN category V (protected landscape/seascape)
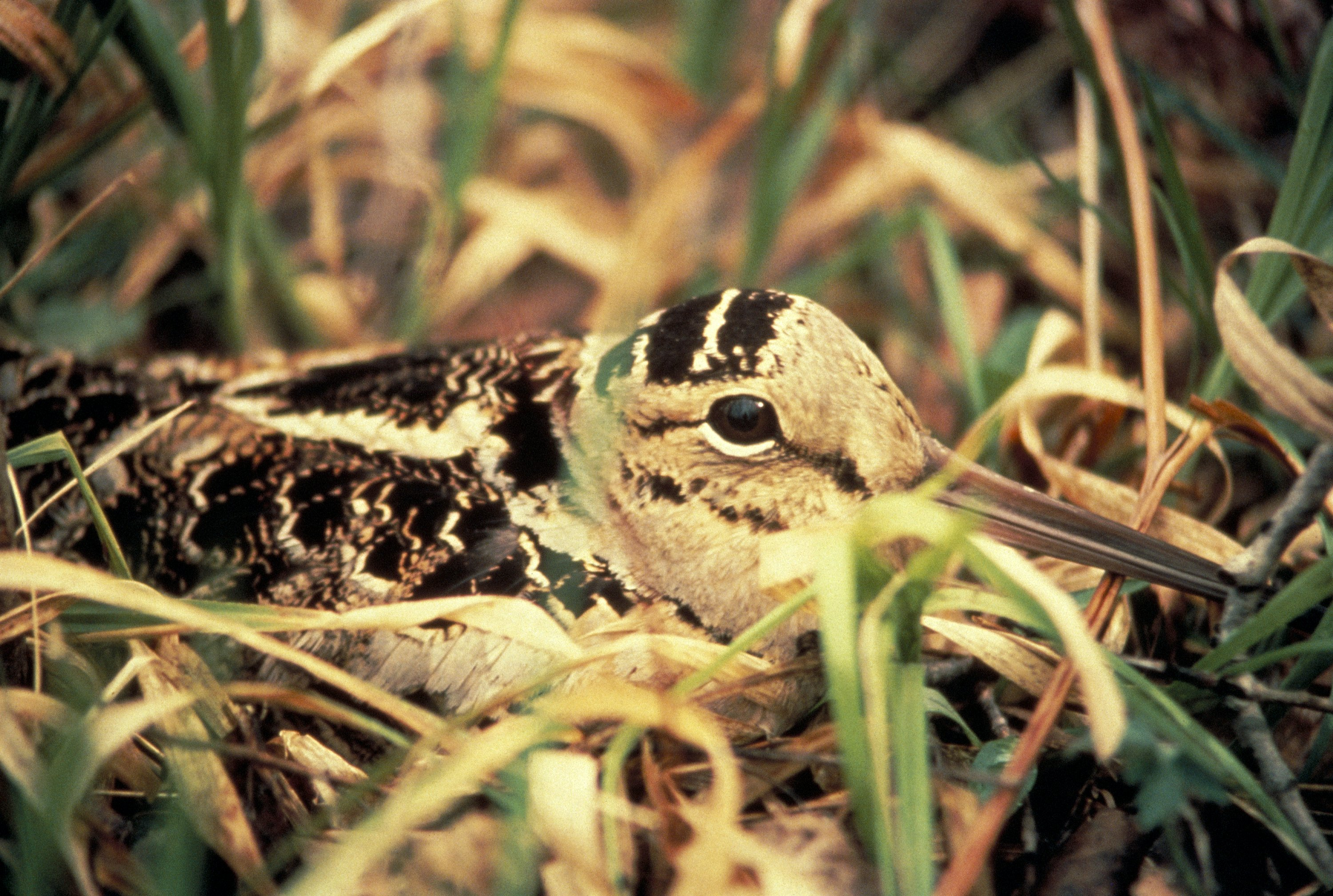
- American woodcock (Scolopax minor) may be found in the Meadow River WMA

- Location within West Virginia
- Location: Greenbrier, West Virginia, United States
- Coordinates: 37°57′05″N 80°41′17″W
- Area: 2,385 acres (9.65 km^{2})
- Elevation: 2,401 ft (732 m)
- Operator: Wildlife Resources Section, WV Division of Natural Resources

Meadow River Wildlife Management Area, is located near Rupert, West Virginia in Greenbrier County. Occupying 2,385 acres (965 ha) of river bottomland, the WMA is located along the Meadow River and consists mainly of wetlands habitat.

== Hunting and fishing ==
Hunting opportunities include deer, grouse, raccoon, squirrel, turkey, waterfowl, and woodcock.

Fishing is available in the Meadow River.

Camping is not available in the WMA. Camping is available in nearby Babcock State Park.

== See also ==
- Animal conservation
- Fishing
- Hunting
- List of West Virginia wildlife management areas
