= Grassy Meadows, West Virginia =

- Unincorporated community
- Location within West Virginia Location within the United States
- Coordinates: 37°49′36″N 80°43′15″W
- Country: United States
- State: West Virginia
- County: Greenbrier
- Elevation: 2,454 ft (748 m)
- Time zone: UTC-5 (Eastern (EST))
  - Summer (DST): UTC-4 (EDT)
- ZIP code: 24943
- Area codes: 304 & 681
- GNIS feature ID: 1549713

Grassy Meadows is an unincorporated community in Greenbrier County, West Virginia, United States. Grassy Meadows is 7 miles (11 km) east-southeast of Meadow Bridge. Grassy Meadows had a post office, which opened on June 15, 1858, and closed on June 25, 2011.

The community most likely derives its name in part from the nearby Meadow River.
