= Lilly Park, West Virginia =

- Unincorporated community
- Location within West Virginia Location within the United States
- Coordinates: 37°57′01″N 80°47′54″W
- Country: United States
- State: West Virginia
- County: Greenbrier
- Elevation: 2,428 ft (740 m)
- Time zone: UTC-5 (Eastern (EST))
  - Summer (DST): UTC-4 (EDT)
- Area codes: 304 & 681
- GNIS feature ID: 1541963

Lilly Park is an unincorporated community in Greenbrier County, West Virginia, United States. Lilly Park is located on West Virginia Route 20, 2 miles (3.2 km) southwest of Rainelle.
