= Ruth Edwards (disambiguation) =

Ruth Edwards is a British Conservative Party politician.

Ruth Edwards may also refer to:

- Ruth E. Edwards, book artist
- Ruth Dudley Edwards, Irish revisionist historian and writer
- Ruth Fowler Edwards, British geneticist
- Ruth Denson Edwards, figure in the Sacred Harp movement
- Ruth Edwards (cyclist), an American cyclist
