= Ruth E. Edwards =

American artists' book creator

- Born: April 2, 1940; New York, New York, U.S.
- Died: October 16, 2020 (aged 80); New York, New York
- Education: Center for Book Arts
- Known for: artists' books, curator, paper engineering

Ruth E. Edwards, a.k.a. Ruth·ology, was a book artist, instructor and founder of Books in Black, a collective of African American book makers.

== Biography ==
Ruth E. Edwards was born in New York. She received her undergraduate degree in business from Pace University. In 1998, after a career as an administrator for a major New York bank, Edwards was introduced to handmade book arts. She took various bookmaking courses at the Center for Book Arts in New York City to learn the craft. Edwards would later serve on the Center for Book Arts Board of Directors from 2001 to 2004.

== Ruth·ology ==
Edwards creates and publishes unique and limited-edition artists books of various structures such as accordion, miniature, eight-page single sheet, pop-up, scrolls, and star or carousel books under the name Ruth·ology.

Edwards’ work, Black Rodeo, was included in the landmark Minnesota Center for Book Arts 2007 exhibit “We, Too, Are Book Artists” curated by Amos Paul Kennedy. The exhibit showcased unique books by twenty-three artists including Ben Blout, Dindga McCannon, Clarissa Sligh, Danny Tisdale, Trenton Doyle Hancock, Kara Walker, and Bisa Washington. The exhibition was the “first large-scale exhibit of African-American book art.”

=== Selected works ===
The following are selected titles created by Edwards.

- Black Rodeo, illustrations by Izell Glover, limited edition, 2003. Star book structure with leather cover. Included in the 2007 exhibit "We, Too, Are Book Artists."
- Book, 14-page whimsical miniature book, limited edition of 121, 1998. Included in the UCLA Library Department of Special Collections, Young Research Collection.
- The Circus (2002), Included in the 2003 Instructors Exhibition at the Center for Book Arts, NY.
- How the Sandwich Got Its Name, limited edition, circa. 2005. Short history of the sandwich from its invention by the Earl of Sandwich.
- On the Ropes, about Jack Johnson, the first black heavyweight champion. One of a kind, circa. 2003.
- Read, 14-page miniature book and companion to Book, limited edition of 121, circa 1998.
- She Put a Dent In It!, biography of Clotilde Dent Bowen, MD, the first Black woman to attain the rank of Colonel in the United States Army. One of a kind, circa. 2003.
- The Steps of A Giant, about Colin L. Powell. One of a kind, circa. 2003.
- Tits: The Indignities Thrust Upon Sisters, Limited edition, circa. 2000. Comical look at annual mammograms.
- With Care. A dos-a-dos book structure, housed in a wooden box. One side has text by Edwards. The other side has illustrations by Tom Feelings.

== Books in Black ==
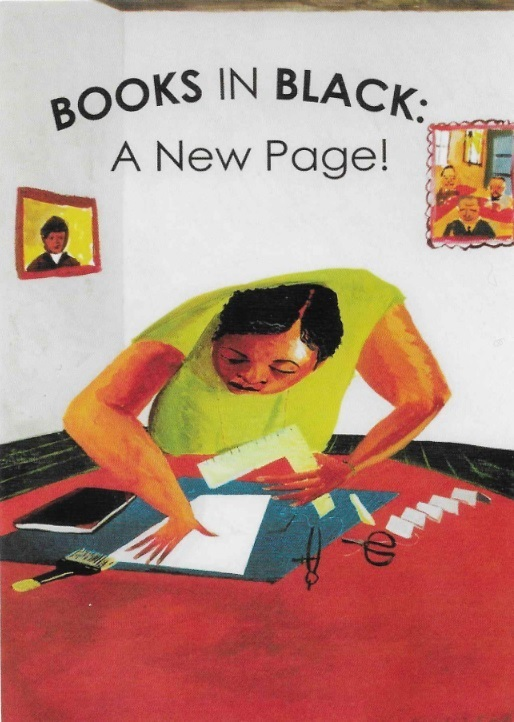
Books in Black poster by R Gregory Christie, circa 2007, was used to promote the artists' book making collective.

Books in Black is a collective of individual African Americans and others from the African diaspora who are “ordinary people who make extraordinary books.” The group informally came together in late 2002 to crafts books for a Black History Month program. Following the successful reception of its 2003 exhibit, Edwards formally organized the group. The collective focused on creating unique books that highlighted aspects of African American history and achievement. "We are not trying to write an encyclopedia. We write a few sentences to steer people in the right direction, and to say, this was one man and he made one heck of a contribution," Edwards told one reporter.

Professionally, members included art and music teachers, computer specialists, crafters, dollmakers, event planners, illustrators, librarians, photographers, and mixed media artists. Exhibiting members include Edwards, the collective's founder, and the following:

1. Jamil Abdul-Azim
2. Kamari Allah
3. Gail Beckford
4. R. Gregory Christie
5. Vernell Conyers
6. Francine J. Davis
7. Valerie Deas
8. Shirley Eddings
9. Brenda H. Falus
10. Ione M. Foote
11. Cheryl Shackelton Hawkins
12. Paula Holland
13. Cleo Meri Abut Jarvis
14. Katrina Jeffries
15. Wanda Jones
16. Yvonne Lamar-Rogers
17. Evemnise Landsman
18. Irene M. Mays
19. Sandra Oei
20. Andrea Ramsey
21. Sandra Redman
22. Shimoda
23. Dolores Taylor
24. Harriette Washington-Williams
25. JoAnn Williams

=== Selected exhibitions ===
Edwards curated each Books in Black exhibition. Each exhibit included promotional postcards and distinctively-made catalogs or exhibition lists.

Year	Dates	Title	Location	Notes
2003	Feb 1 – Mar 31	Inventing in Color: A Tribute to Black Inventors by African-American Artisans	Mount Vernon Public Library, Mount Vernon, NY	Exhibit included 32 artists books. Each book highlighted a specific Black inventor such as biochemist Emmett Chappelle, flight attendant Debrilla M. Ratchford, scientist George Washington Carver, engineer Garrett A. Morgan and inventor Sarah Boone. The library extended the exhibit by one month because it was so popular with local teachers and students.
2003	Nov 14 – Nov 23	Inventing In Color	Festival de Arte Negra, Belo Horizonte, Brazil	
2004	Jan 29 – Apr 5	The First One Who…!	The Center for Book Arts, New York, NY	Seventeen Blacks in Book artists exhibited 32 structural books. Books profiled artist Jean-Michel Basquiat, singers Nat King Cole, Aretha Franklin, comedian Moms Mabley, businessman Ernest Stanley O’Neal, and other newsworthy “firsts.” The exhibit was dedicated to artist Tom Feelings, according to the exhibit catalog.
2005	Feb 1 – Mar 20	Book Arts: Inventing in Color	Brooklyn Public Library, Central Library, NY	Also featured at the library were exhibits of works by photographer Martha Cooper and African American quilter Edward Bostick.
2006	Oct 10 – Jan 31	Books in Black: A New Page!	The National Museum of Catholic Art and History, New York, NY	Two themes: Inventing in Color included 19 artists books and The First Ones Who ...! included 13 artists books.
2007	Feb 15 – Apr 15	Books in Black: A New Page! A Tribute to Black Inventors	The Jaffe Center for Book Arts, Florida Atlantic University, Boca Raton, Florida	38 handcrafted books feature achievements by Dr. George Franklin Grant, who patented the first golf tee, prima ballerina Janet Collins, and the carbon filament inventor Lewis Howard Lattimer.
2007	Jul 15 – Aug 31	Books in Black: A New Page! A Tribute to Black Inventors & First Achievers	Cary-McPheeters Gallery, Auburn Avenue Research Library of African American Culture and History, Atlanta, GA	Exhibit included 37 artists books.
2011	Jul 1 – Aug 5	Books in Black: A New Page!	Salem Courthouse Community Center, Salem, NY	Works by fourteen Books in Black collective members featured.

== Co-op City Youth and Book Arts ==
Edwards, a longtime resident of Co-op City in the Bronx, taught book arts and other life skills to children ages 12 to 18 from 2007 to 2011 through the Scholarship Incentive Awards Program, which she founded. In 2008, the young people collected recipes and created a limited-edition cookbook titled “What’s Cookin? Recipes of the Elders."

Electrified by the election of President Barack Obama, eight young people in the Scholarship Incentive Awards Program created an artists' book inspired by their hopes for the new leader. Each participant wrote a personal letter expressing their hopes to the president. Each focused on a specific topic and created the accompanied illustrations. The participants included Tara E. Davis (the economy), Samantha M. Medina (education), Matthew Salmon (health care), Anthony Purnell (war), Newton V. Salmon (domestic energy), Shaneice Silvera (global warming), Quinten Campbell (international relations) and Bryce Campbell (racial harmony). Edward instructed the participants and designed the 30-foot long accordion book.

Deborah Willis, co-author of the book Obama: The Historic Campaign in Photographs, met with the group and helped raised funds for the project. Over several months the teens handmade sixteen copies of the accordion-fold book.

In August 2009, during Co-op City's annual National Night Out, Bronx Borough President Rubén Díaz Jr. and Congressman Joseph Crowley joined Edwards and the teens to unfurl and display the 30-foot long book to festival attendees. Crowley's office was instrumental in delivering a copy of the book to the White House in 2010.

In 2014, President Obama's To Do List, the artists' book Edwards and her eight young students created, was added to the Smithsonian Libraries permanent collection. Doug Litts, head of the American Art Museum/National Art Museum Library at the time, noted that “only 6 to 10 books from throughout the nation are added to the collection each year.”
