= Charmco, West Virginia =

Unincorporated community in West Virginia, United States

- Unincorporated community
- Location within West Virginia Location within the United States
- Coordinates: 38°00′08″N 80°44′13″W
- Country: United States
- State: West Virginia
- County: Greenbrier
- Elevation: 2,408 ft (734 m)
- Time zone: UTC-5 (Eastern (EST))
  - Summer (DST): UTC-4 (EDT)
- ZIP code: 25958
- Area codes: 304 & 681
- GNIS feature ID: 1554112

Charmco is an unincorporated community and coal town in Greenbrier County, West Virginia, United States. Charmco is located at the junction of U.S. Route 60 and West Virginia Route 20, northeast of Rainelle. Charmco has a post office with ZIP code 25958. The community was named for the Charleston Milling Company.

== See also ==
- Charmco Lofts
