= Meadow River Lumber Company =

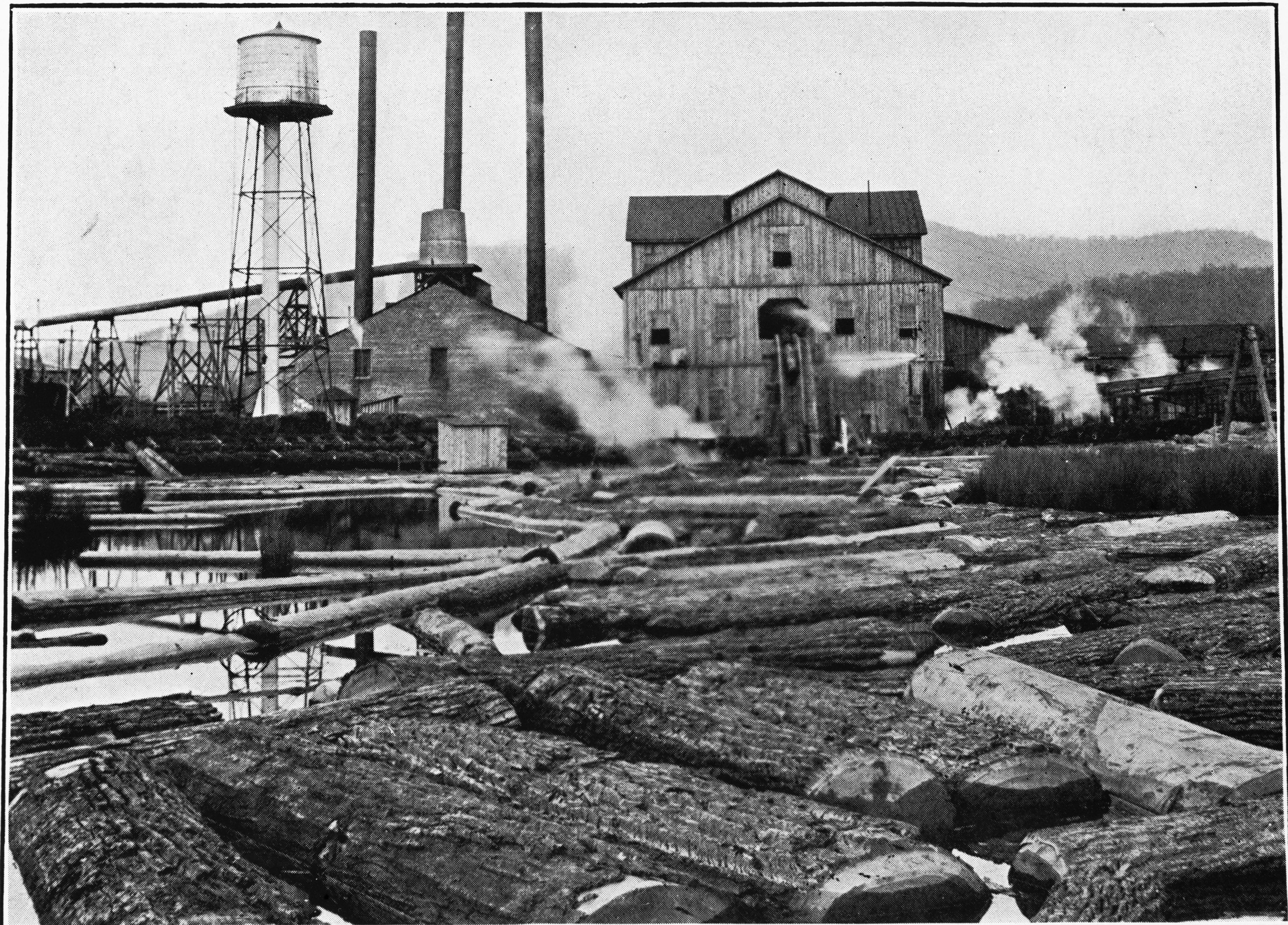
The mill as it appeared in 1917.

The Meadow River Lumber Company, which operated in Rainelle, West Virginia from 1906 to 1975, was the largest hardwood sawmill in the world. It had three 9 feet (2.7 m) bandsaws under one roof. In 1928, during peak production, its 500 employees produced 31 million board feet (73,000 m^{3}) of lumber, cutting 3,000 acres (12 km^{2}) of virgin timber a year.

== History ==
In 1903, the brothers Thomas and John Raine of Ironton, Ohio and later Empire, Pennsylvania joined a lumber firm operating near Evenwood in Randolph County, West Virginia. Later, in 1906, they began purchasing 100,000 acres (400 km^{2}) of land, containing one of the last large stands of virgin hardwood in the United States, mostly on the Meadow River drainage, in western Greenbrier County, West Virginia. Being 20 miles (32 km) to the nearest railroad mainline, they first formed the Sewell Valley Railroad Company to construct a spur line, which eventually evolved into the Meadow River Railroad. This spur was initially used to haul building materials into the wilderness area, and eventually to haul their products out to market. Mill construction began in 1909, and the first board was sawed in September, 1910. Ultimately the mill contained three 9-foot (2.7 m) bandsaws under one roof, making it the largest hardwood sawmill.

The plant and railroad operated several Shay locomotives, one of which was acquired by the Cass Scenic Railroad in 1964, and has since fallen into disrepair.

The plant included a planing mill with the capacity of turning out a million feet (2,360,000 cubic meters) of flooring, ceiling, siding and trim pieces a year. Six large kilns dried lumber for use in the planing mill.

3 miles (4.8 km) of lumber piles, some 40 feet (12 m) high, were stacked on the ten, 1,300 feet (400 m) long lumber docks.

In 1913, the firm created the nearby town of Rainelle. Company-owned houses there were plastered and papered inside, painted white outside, and designed for sanitation, with modern plumbing and electricity. Each had a yard and a garden space surrounding it.

The original mill building was destroyed by fire in 1924. The employees were set to work building a new one, which was operational by March of the following year.

Meadow River lumber began the process called clearcutting in 1939.

Major products included flooring, hardwood shoe heels, furniture, and later moldings and trim. By the time the mill ceased operation, it was the world's largest producer of women's hardwood shoe heels and flooring. It was also the last of the Eastern United States' large independent wood producers.

The business was sold to Georgia-Pacific Corporation in 1970, and the mill was subsequently torn down in 1975.
