= Max Hayslette =

American artist (1930–2024)

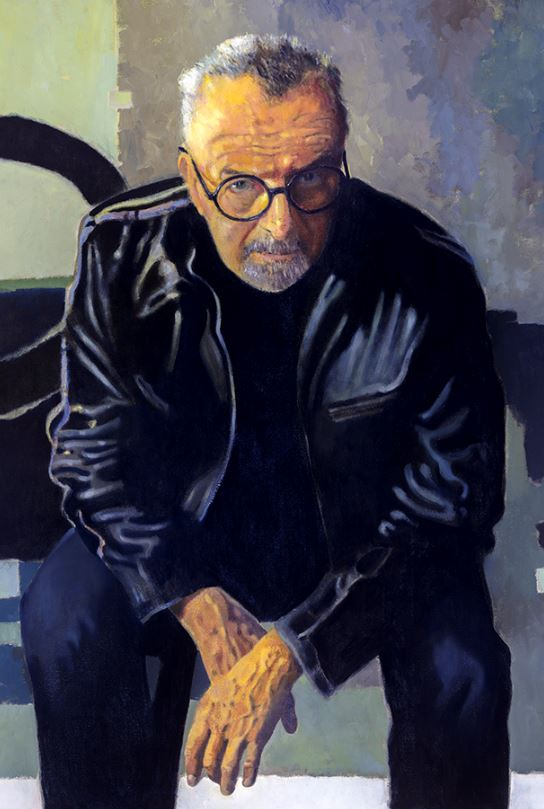
"Max at 90" self-portrait by Max Hayslette (2019), original work held by the Main Downtown Library at West Virginia University, Morgantown.

Max Hayslette (born Maxwell Hayslette; June 11, 1929 – December 21, 2024) was an American painter, exhibit designer and graphic artist. He is best known for his landscape and abstract paintings which have been broadly marketed throughout the United States, and internationally, in the form of limited-edition serigraph and giclee prints.

== Life and career ==
Born in Rupert, West Virginia on June 11, 1929, Hayslette showed artistic ability early in life and began exhibiting his work at venues including the Allied Artists of West Virginia and West Virginia Women's Club art exhibits when he was still in high school. Graduating as valedictorian of his class in 1948, he studied for two years at the American Academy of Art in Chicago and subsequently attended classes at the Art Institute of Chicago where his teachers included Egon Weiner and Alexander Archipenko. In 1952, he began working for Kenneth Olson Design in Chicago. Except for a period of military service in 1953–1954, he remained with Olson until relocating in Seattle in 1961.

Hayslette joined Martin Berg and Associates, interior and exhibit designers, in Seattle in 1962. His assignments during the next decade included developing major exhibits for industrial clients including Boeing, Mitsubishi and Georgia-Pacific, and designing pavilions for four World’s Fairs. Winning acclaim for his State of Alaska pavilions at both the 1962 Seattle, and 1964 New York World’s Fairs, Hayslette’s Australia Pavilion at the 1974 Spokane World’s Fair was singled out by The New York Times as the Fair’s “most successful” exhibit in reflecting the event’s environmentally friendly theme.

In 1973, Hayslette founded Olympus Graphics. The Seattle-based company produced affordable, large-scale (up to 8 feet in length) limited-edition serigraphs featuring artwork by Hayslette for corporate and hotel interior decoration. Olympus Graphics developed a nationwide clientele before being acquired, and renamed Grand Image, by Larry Winn in 1984.

While Hayslette continued to create original artwork for Grand Image, he focused increasingly on pursuing his own painting interests in the ensuing years. Equally conversant in realism and abstraction, his work has since been featured in dozens of solo shows at galleries in the states of Washington, California, North Carolina and West Virginia, and at institutions including the Bainbridge Island Museum of Art and West Virginia University. The latter institution holds an extensive collection of Hayslette’s work as well as personal papers documenting his long and diverse career. Hayslette died on December 21, 2024, at the age of 95.
