= Charmco Building =

- U.S. National Register of Historic Places
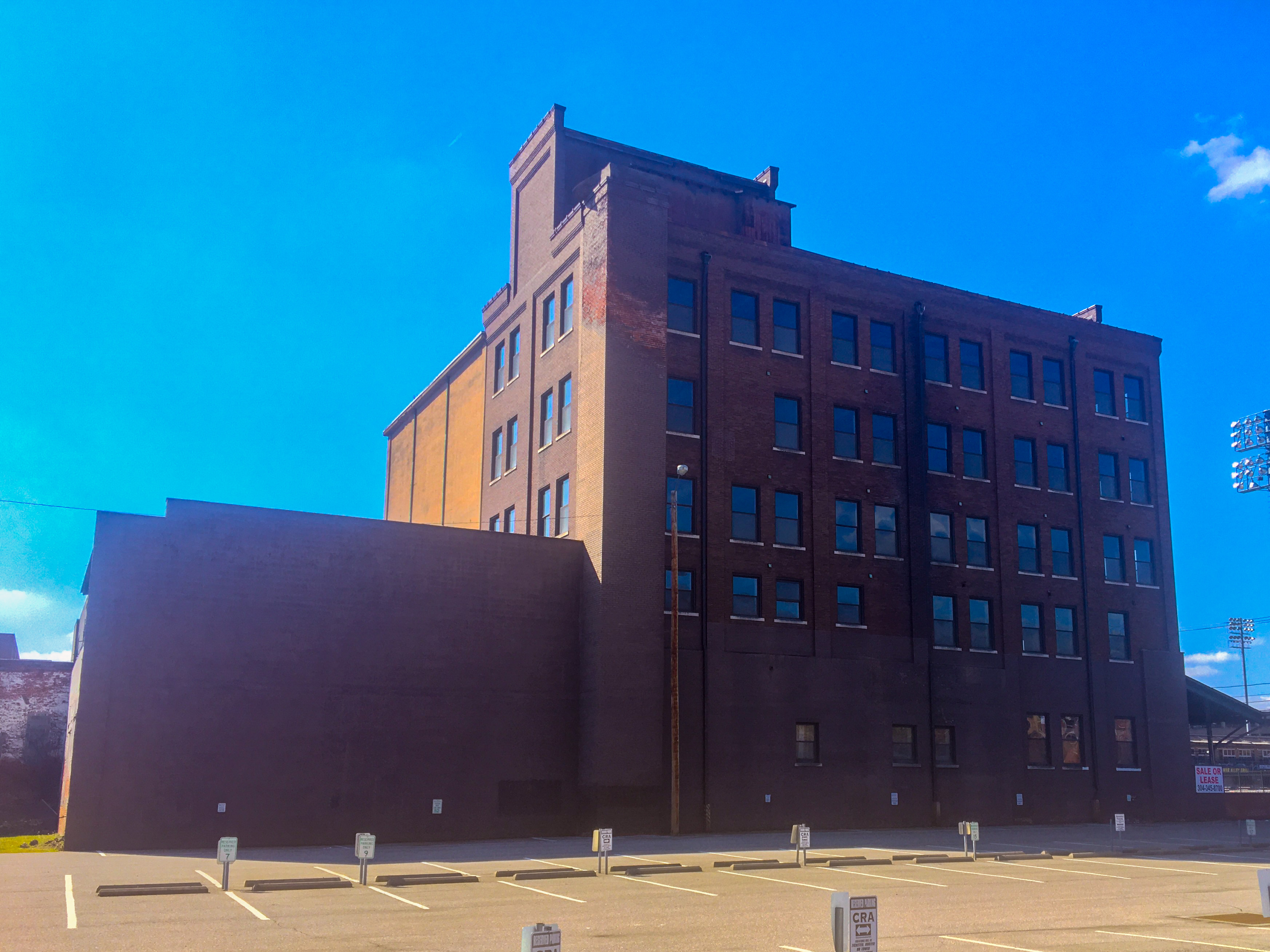
- Exterior of building in 2021

- Location within West Virginia Location within the United States
- Location: 606 Morris Street; Charleston, West Virginia
- Coordinates: 38°20′54.96″N 81°37′27.48″W
- Built: 1914
- NRHP reference No.: 100005828
- Added to NRHP: November 30, 2020

The Charmco Building, or the home of Charleston Milling and Produce Company, was the site of its mill in Charleston. This mill replaced a prior one located on the same site that burnt down in 1913.

Charmco in Greenbriar County, West Virginia was named after the company. The company closed in 1956 and the building was leased out as warehouse space. The building, now vacant, was listed for sale in 2011 and remained on the market, until 2021, when it was listed as "under contract."
