= Meadow River =

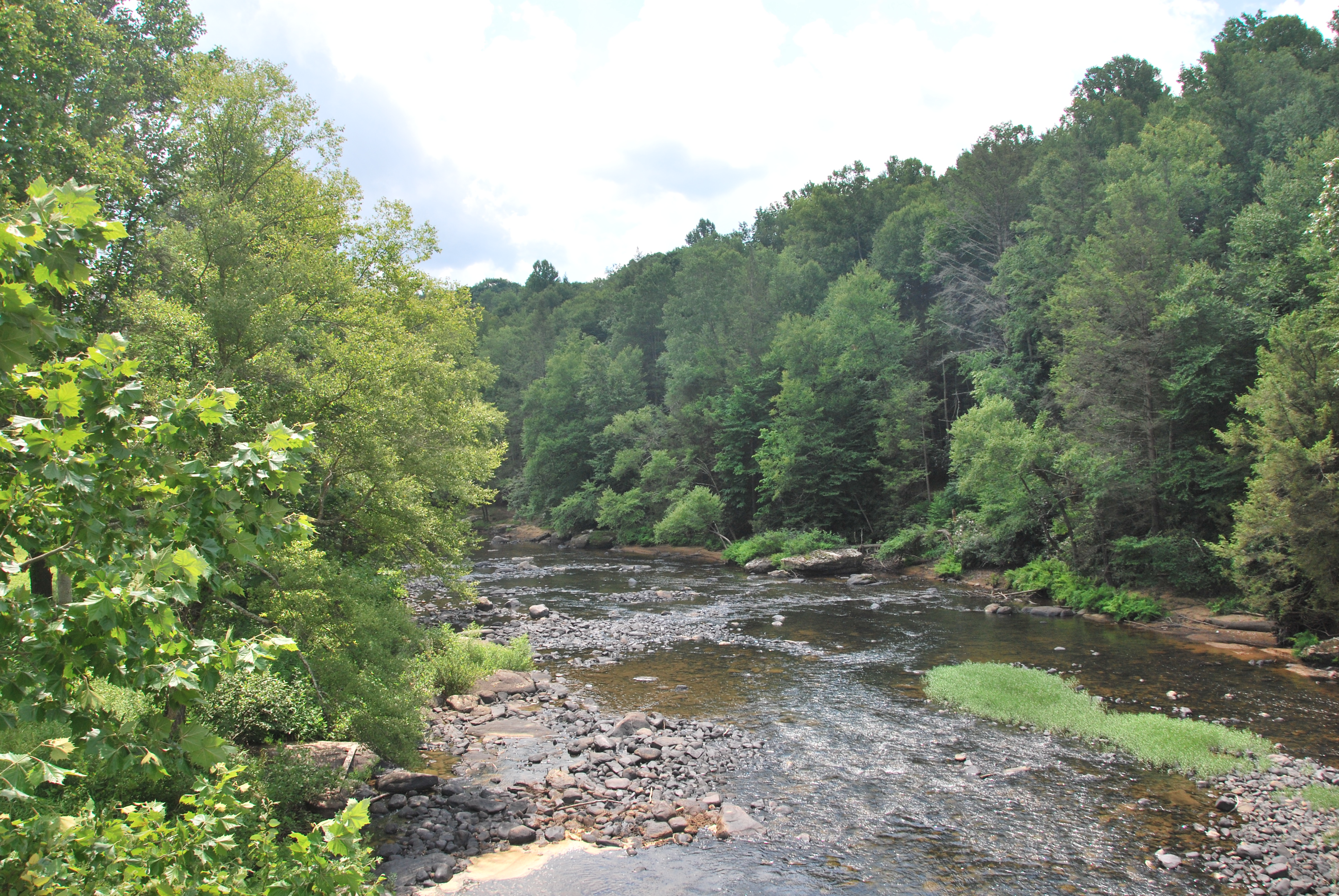
- Meadow River at Russellville in July 2014

Location
- Country: United States
- State: West Virginia
- Counties: Greenbrier, Nicholas

Physical characteristics
- Source: Eagle Branch
  - location: Little Sewell Mountain, Greenbrier County, WV
  - coordinates: 37°46′54″N 080°42′26″W
- 2nd source: Callahan Branch
  - location: Bennett's Mountain, Greenbrier County, WV
- Source confluence: Grassy Meadows, West Virginia
  - location: Greenbrier County, WV
  - coordinates: 37°53′38″N 080°42′17″W
- Mouth: Gauley River
  - location: Carnifex Ferry, WV
  - coordinates: 38°11′36″N 080°56′40″W
- Discharge
  - location: Carnifex Ferry

The Meadow River is a tributary of the Gauley River, making its headwaters in Greenbrier County and terminating in Nicholas County of West Virginia. It is named for the grassy meadows wetlands which its upper watershed drains, and from which it springs.

== Course ==
Formed at the confluence of Eagle Branch and Callahan Branch, and flowing generally southeast to northwest, it passes Rupert, Charmco, and Rainelle. Major tributaries include Methodist Branch, Otter Creek, Little Clear Creek, Big Clear Creek, Mill Creek, Laurel Creek, Meadow Creek, Brackens Creek, Young's Creek, Glade Creek, Hendricks Creek and Dogwood Creek, before reaching its mouth at the Gauley River at Carnifex Ferry, West Virginia. The river flows a total of 53 miles (85 km), mostly within the Meadow River Wildlife Management Area. The lower 5 miles (8.0 km) is within the Gauley River National Recreation Area. The river drains 365 square miles (950 km^{2}).

Via the Gauley, New, Kanawha and Ohio Rivers, it becomes a part of the Mississippi River watershed.

== History ==
In 1858 a dam was proposed near the present day site of the town of Rainelle, between Big Sewell and Laurel Mountains. It was never built.

== Whitewater paddling below Rainelle ==
The 15 miles (24 km) stretch between Rainelle, WV and Russelville features class III, IV, and a touch of class V in high water. After a flatwater stretch the river reaches the town of Nallen. Immediately below Nallen features mostly class III and IV water for the next 5 miles (8.0 km) running up to the U.S. 19 bridge. The final lower section below the U.S. 19 bridge to the confluence of the Gauley River is arguably the most difficult whitewater river in West Virginia. This class V+ section has an extreme gradient and severely undercut rocks—claiming the lives of three experienced paddlers since records began to be kept.

Rapids include:

- Put In (Class III+)
- Rites of Passage (Class IV+)
- Hells Gates (Class 5.2)
- Brink of Disaster (Class 5.0)
- Coming Home Sweet Jesus (Class 5.3)
- Sieve City (Class 5.0)
- Heavy Water (Class IV)
- Lets Make a Deal (Class IV+)
- First and Second Island (Class V)
- Sliding Board (Class IV+)
- Double Undercut (Class 5.1)

== See also ==
- List of rivers of West Virginia
