= Greenbrier State Forest =

State forest in Greenbrier County, West Virginia

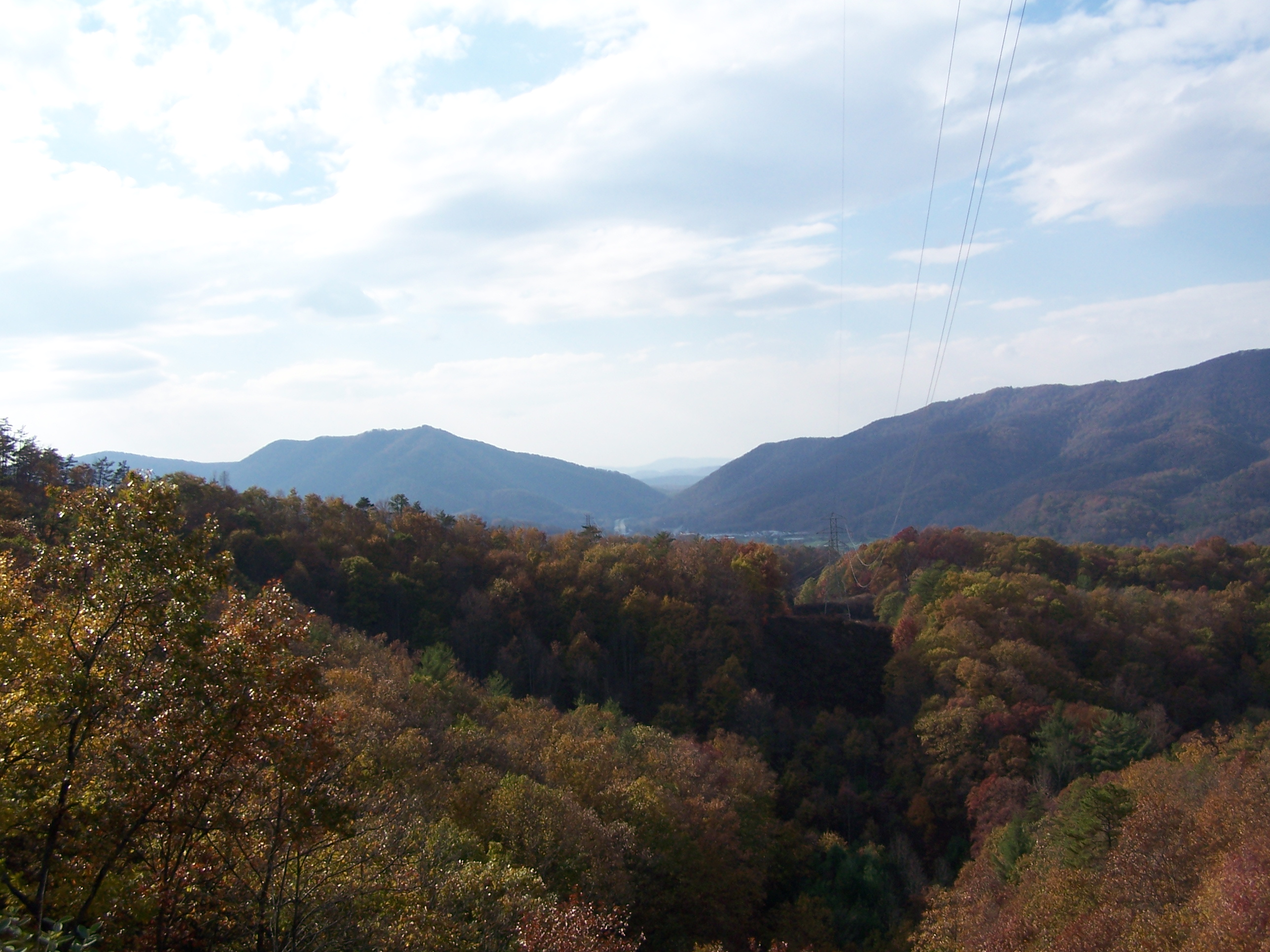
- Howard Creek gap in Greenbrier Mountain

- Location within West Virginia Location within the United States
- Location: Greenbrier, West Virginia, United States
- Coordinates: 37°44′22″N 80°20′00″W
- Area: 5,133 acres (20.77 km^{2})
- Elevation: 3,169 ft (966 m)
- Established: 1938
- Operator: West Virginia Division of Natural Resources and West Virginia Division of Forestry
- Website: wvstateparks.com/park/greenbrier-state-forest/

Greenbrier State Forest is a 5,133-acre (21 km^{2}) state forest between Lewisburg and White Sulphur Springs in Greenbrier County, West Virginia, United States. Greenbrier State Forest is located on Harts Run, a tributary of Howard Creek, and contains historic Kate's Mountain (3,330 feet/1,015 m).

Greenbrier State Forest features 13 miles (21 km) of hiking trails, many of which are also suitable for mountain biking. There is a heated pool, numerous picnic sites with two shelters, archery range, muzzleloading rifle range, horseshoes, 18 basket disc golf course, and volleyball. A naturalist provides nature and recreational events during the summer months.

Hunting and fishing are permitted; state licenses are required.

Accommodations include 12 one- and two-bedroom cabins, 1 handicapped accessible cabin, and 16 campsites with electric hookups and water available at the central bathhouse.
