= Clotilde Dent Bowen =

American psychiatrist and US Army Colonel

Dr Clotilde Dent Bowen
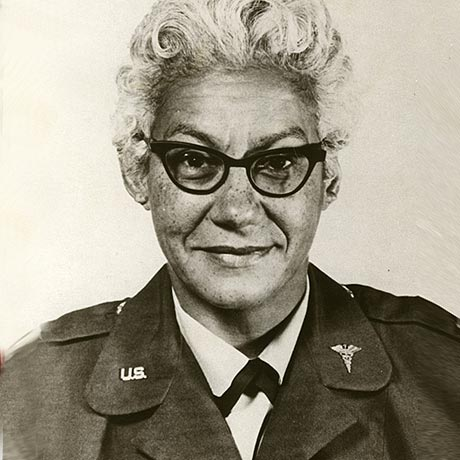
- Clotilde Dent Bowen in 1975
- Born: Clotilde Dent; March 20, 1923; Chicago, U.S.
- Died: March 3, 2011 (aged 87); Denver, U.S.
- Education: Ohio State University
- Military career
- Branch: United States Army
- Service years: 1955–1959, 1966–1995
- Rank: Colonel
- Known for: Advocacy for support for drug abuse and PTSD in the military; First African-American woman colonel in the U.S. Army; First woman to command a U.S. military hospital
- Conflicts: Vietnam War
- Awards: Bronze Star; Legion of Merit; Meritorious Service Medal
- Memorials: Bowen House, Ohio State University

Clotilde Dent Bowen (March 20, 1923 – March 11, 2011) was a psychiatrist who became the first African-American woman to reach the rank of colonel in the U.S. Army. Bowen was also the first African-American woman to graduate in medicine from Ohio State University (in 1947), the first Black physician to hold a military commission, and the first woman commander of a U.S. military hospital. In 1970, Bowen served in the Vietnam War, as chief psychiatrist for the U.S. Army. She was awarded a Bronze Star and American Legion of Merit in 1971 for her work in establishing drug treatment centers and her efforts to reduce racial tensions in Vietnam. She was also awarded a Meritorious Service Medal (in 1974). Bowen continued to advocate for services and support for services for drug dependency, support for soldiers with post-traumatic stress disorders, and human rights.

== Early life ==
Clotilde Dent was born in March 1923 in Chicago, Illinois, the second of three children. She was named after her mother, Clotilde Tynes Dent. Her father, William Marion Dent, was an alumnus of Dartmouth University.

From age three, after her parents separated, she lived on a U.S. Army base in Columbus, Ohio, with her maternal aunt Maude Barrows and uncle. Her uncle, Stephen Barrows, was a Buffalo Soldier, and he passed on his love of the military. From a very young age, Clotilde wanted to become a doctor.

== Education ==
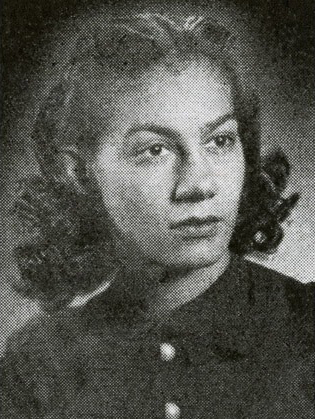
Clotilde Dent Bowen, 1947 Ohio University Yearbook

Dent went to school in Columbus, graduating from East High School. Dent then studied at Ohio State University, gaining a Bachelor of Arts degree in three years. In January 1944, she became the first African-American woman admitted to the university's School of Medicine, graduating in 1947.

At university, Dent was a member of the Delta Sigma Theta sorority, the American Enterprise Institute, the Elizabeth Blackwell Society, and the School of Medicine's Graduation Committee. She married William Nolan Bowen while she was a student.

After graduation, Bowen moved to New York, where she interned at Harlem Hospital and completed a residency at Triboro Hospital for Tuberculosis in Long Island.

== Career ==
After having become interested in tuberculosis during her residency, Bowen undertook a fellowship in tuberculosis with the New York State Health Department from 1949 to 1950. She worked in a public tuberculosis clinic for five years, and also opened a private pulmonologist practice in Harlem, New York.

In 1955, dissatisfied with life in the city, and wanting a career change, Bowen began her career in the U.S. Army. She was assigned as a pulmonary (lung) specialist to Valley Forge Army Hospital in Pennsylvania, where she became interested in psychiatry. Bowen was promoted to major in 1959, but was not accepted into training for psychiatry. So she left the Army to complete training as a psychiatrist at the Veterans Administration (VA) Hospital in Albany, New York. She also joined the Army Reserve in Albany. In 1962, Bowen was transferred to a VA hospital Oregon as staff psychiatrist.

Bowen decided to return to Army service after the death of a friend's son in Vietnam in 1966. In 1967, now a lieutenant colonel, she was assigned as chief psychiatrist to Tripler Army Medical Center in Hawaii, followed by Schofield Barracks. In July 1968, Bowen became the first African-American woman promoted to the rank of colonel, and was transferred to a hospital in Denver, Colorado.

In 1970, Bowen was assigned to Vietnam as chief of psychiatry for the Army. Bowen wrote that she arrived to "a hail of gunfire, rockets, mortar rounds and unbearable heat." She was in Vietnam for a year. Bowen was often under fire while in her bunker and while traveling by jeep or helicopter to visit psychiatric staff, including being in a helicopter that was shot down. Concerned at the number of soldiers overdosing on heroin, Bowen set up an investigation throughout the medical command to ascertain the extent of the overdoses, then worked to address the issue in a variety of ways. In 1971, Bowen was awarded the Bronze Star and the American Legion of Merit for her work in setting up drug treatment centers, and her efforts to reduce racial tensions. She continued to be a prominent advocate for improved support for soldiers with post-traumatic stress disorder, and alcohol and drug dependency after her experience in Vietnam.

After her tour in Vietnam, Bowen's assignments included returns to chief psychiatry positions in hospitals in Hawaii and Denver, as well as Indianapolis, Indiana, where she became the first woman to command a US military hospital. In 1974, Bowen was also awarded the Meritorious Service Medal. She retired from the military in 1996.

Bowen's next professional role was in health care accreditation, for The Joint Commission. She also undertook public speaking across the country advocating for human rights. Bowen also returned for a time to VA hospitals in Wyoming and Colorado, with teaching positions at the Universities of Wyoming and Colorado. She also worked as a locum during a physician shortage. In 2001, she wrote a monthly column in The Denver Post. Bowen retired from medical practice in 2008. In retirement, she helped develop and implement an emergency psychiatric program for the American Psychiatric Association.

During her career, Bowen co-authored several publications in medical journals, on tuberculosis treatment and case reports in drug-related psychosis. She also co-authored a chapter on military psychiatry with James L. Collins in Black Psychiatrists and American Psychiatry, published in 1999. Bowen also wrote an unpublished memoir.

== Major achievements and honors ==
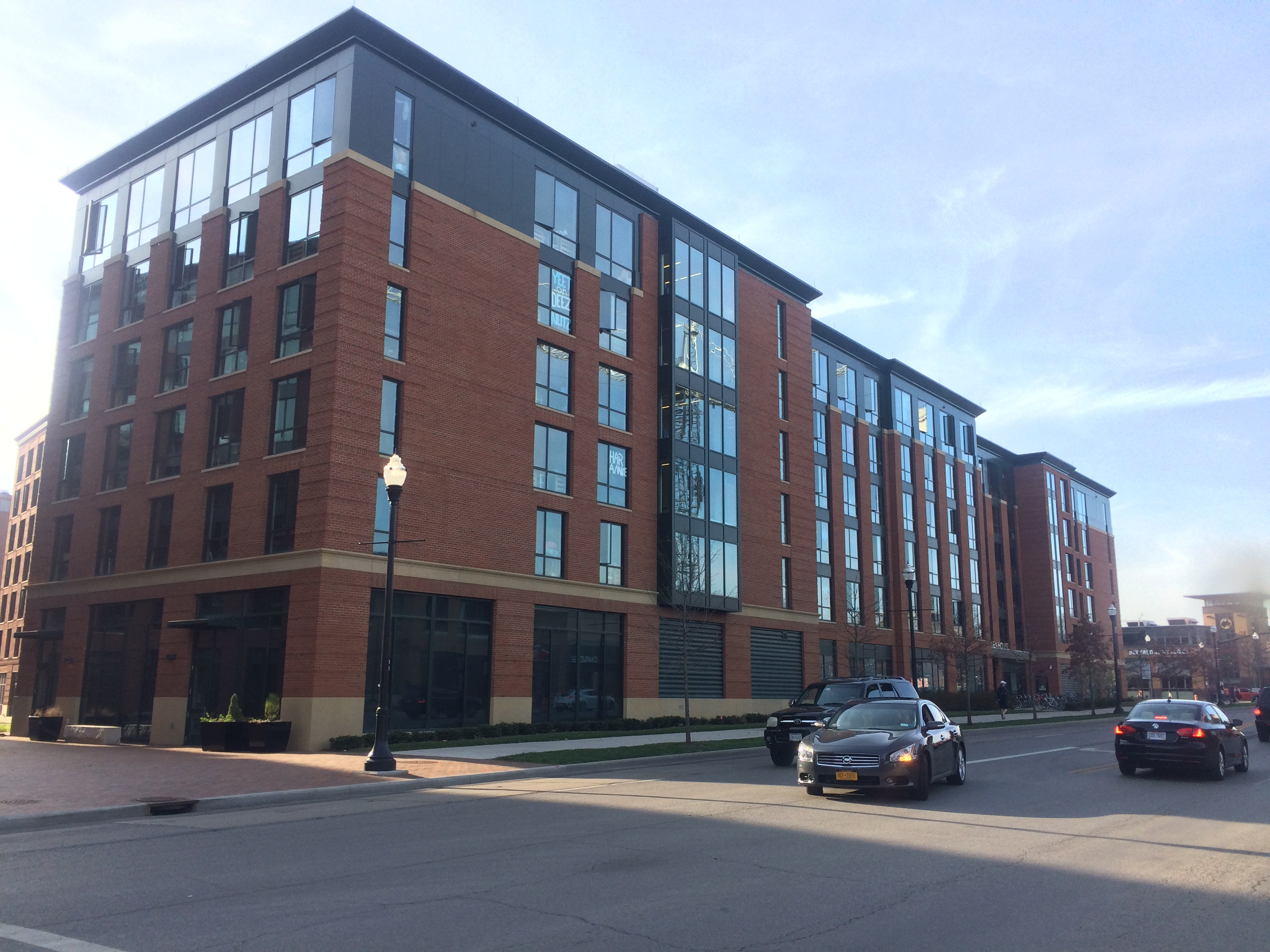
Bowen House (Ohio State)

- Bronze Star and Legion of Merit, in 1971, for her work in setting up drug treatment centers and her efforts to reduce racial tensions during the Vietnam War.
- Meritorious Service Medal, 1974.
- Fellowship of the American Psychiatric Association and the Central Neuro-Psychiatric Association.
- She Put a Dent in It, a single-issue biography of Bowen by artist Ruth E. Edwards, in around 2003.
- Tribute Event at the Ohio State University, 2012.
- Annual Clotilde Bowen Diversity Lecture, Ohio State University.
- Bowen House, an Ohio State University Residence Hall, named in her honor in 2015.
- Ohio State University Hall of Fame, 2021.
- Bowen endowed a scholarship at the Ohio State University School of Medicine.

== Personal life ==
Bowen married for a short time when she was a medical student. When she was interviewed for Ebony magazine in 1968, she was living with Pamela Rancourt, who was a nurse. She later had a longterm relationship with Dr Athenia "Micki" Athans, which lasted to the end of her life.

Bowen had a variety of outdoor and active pursuits, including boating, trail bike riding, and playing pool.
