= Amos Paul Kennedy Jr. =

American printer

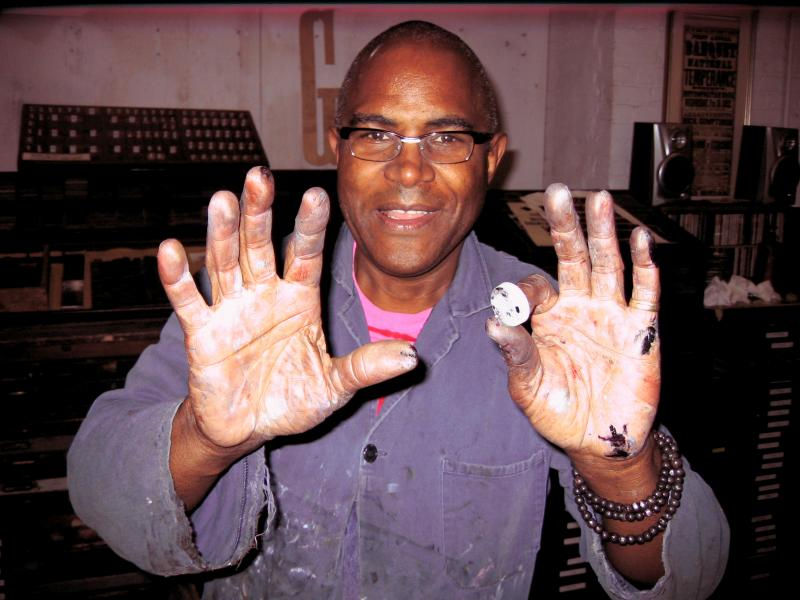
- The artist with inky hands at a "Pull-a-Print" event in Wisconsin, 2010.
- Born: Lafayette, Louisiana
- Education: MFA, University of Wisconsin–Madison, 1997; BS Mathematics, Grambling State University, Louisiana, 1972
- Occupation: printer
- Children: 1
- Relatives: Adric (son)
- Website: kennedyprints.com

Amos Paul Kennedy Jr. (born August 14, 1950) is an American printer, book artist, and papermaker best known for social and political commentary, particularly in printed posters.

== Biography ==
From an early age, Kennedy was interested in letters and books and studied calligraphy for several years. At the age of 40, Kennedy visited Colonial Williamsburg, a Virginia living history museum, and was influenced by a print shop and book bindery demonstration to study printing at a community-based letterpress shop in Chicago. He later left his job to continue his studies.

Kennedy articulated his fascination with letterpress printing in one interview, "I believe it was the capability of making multiples. Multiples of text are important to me. They allow for distribution." He told curator Angelina Lippert with Hyperallergic, "Printing is a very democratic process: you are able to make multiples that can be shared by people."

He attended the University of Wisconsin–Madison, where he was taught by book designer Walter Hamady, and earned a Master of Fine Arts in 1997. He later taught graphic design at the Henry Radford Hope School of Fine Arts at Indiana University Bloomington. His letterpress poster shop, Kennedy Prints, is located in Detroit, Michigan.

== Technique ==
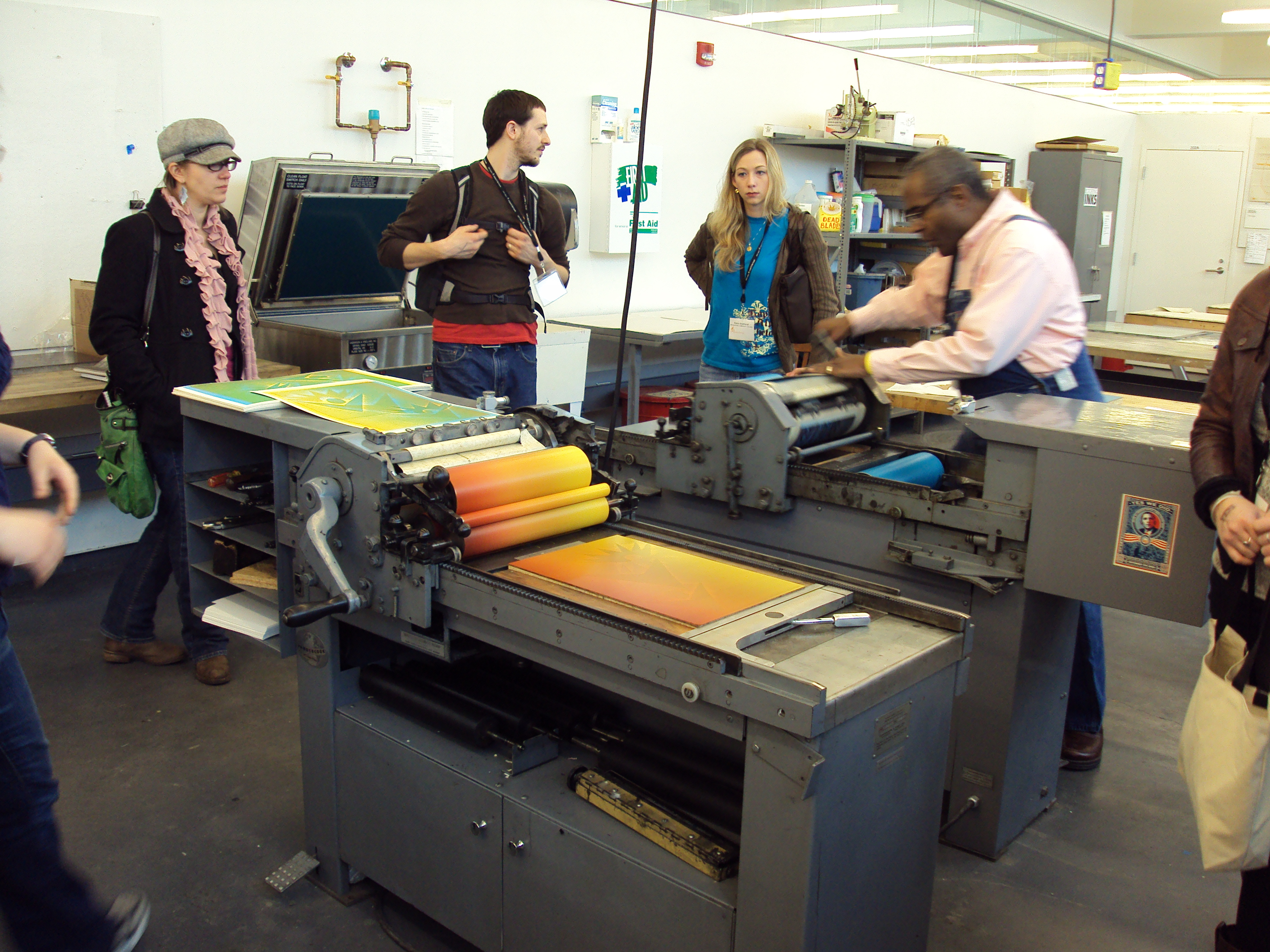
Kennedy teaching a letterpress printing workshop at Washington University in St. Louis during the 2011 SGC International conference

Kennedy creates prints, posters and postcards, often incorporating chipboard, using letterpress printers that operate with handset wood and metal type. Many of his posters are inspired by proverbs, sayings, and quotes related to social justice and the political movements that Kennedy supports.

Using hand presses, he "produces large editions of wildly colorful, typographically-driven posters on inexpensive chipboard stock, posters which are often so riotously layered with vibrant colors of ink as to retain a wet iridescence and tackiness years after they were printed. His working method often involves overprinting multiple layers of text, resulting in no two prints being truly identical."

Some of his earlier posters were printed on coated stock, but he quickly stopped using the board, telling Hyperallergic that the brown color of chipboard emphasizes the rural nature of most of the events."

== Works ==
Kennedy's work is a blend of social commentary, folk art, and graphic design; creating resonant pieces that challenge traditional boundaries of art and politics. Kennedy uses large graphic typography and bold colors. Devoted to addressing the effects of white supremacy and racism, Kennedy has frequently showcased these themes throughout his work.

Kennedy is known to use the words of popular activists like Rosa Parks and peaceful protests like the Selma to Montgomery marches and illustrated the names of lost lives during these movements. The words themselves are central to Kennedy's work, serving not just as visuals but to convey messages that are thought-provoking and sometimes confrontational. These pieces function as more than art; they are a form of communication, drawing attention to the injustices faced by marginalized communities, particularly Black Americans. The unevenness of the printing process, where some letters appear more faded or offset than others, becomes part of the aesthetic and conveys a sense of human imperfection, struggle, and resilience. This imperfect quality also adds a layer of emotional depth to his prints, which suggests that social issues cannot be neatly resolved or erased.

He has created works that address the violence and oppression from law enforcement, as well as the dehumanizing stereotypes that have historically been used to justify racial inequalities. Much like Kennedy's work in the book section 'Why is This Book Needed?' Anne H Berry explains that 'The deaths of these black Americans...served as a spark...' both to protests and to writings on what needs to change. (Berry and Kennedy, 2022, page 22). His pieces engage directly with themes of racial injustice, violence, and inequality, challenging viewers to confront uncomfortable truths. As Kennedy stated in an interview, "The words are not just decoration—they are part of the art's purpose" (Kennedy, 2012). This focus on text allows Kennedy to bridge the gap between art and activism, using the medium of print to communicate directly with a wide audience.

In addition to his printmaking, he has been an active participant in workshops and collaborative art projects, engaging with communities across the United States. Kennedy believes that art should not be confined to galleries or elite spaces; instead, it should be a tool for collective empowerment. As he explains, "Art has the potential to change society, but only if people are involved in making it" (Kennedy, 2011).

A study from 2019 shows that African American artists get much less attention from major art museums, showing us that '85.4% of the works in the collections of all major US museums belong to white artists, and 87.4% are by men. African American artists have the lowest share with just 1.2% of the works; Asian artists with 9%; and Hispanic and Latino artists only 2.8%'.

One critic noted that Kennedy is "unafraid of asking uncomfortable questions about race and artistic pretension."

== Residencies, Exhibitions, and Awards ==
Kennedy has been hosted as an artist-in-residence at a number of institutions, including the Minnesota Center for Book Arts, Virginia Center for the Book at the University of Virginia, BookLab at the University of Maryland, and the Wells College Book Arts Center, among many others.

His work has been exhibited at a range of museums, galleries, and libraries, including the Bainbridge Island Museum of Art, the Museum of Modern Art Library, the Institute for Contemporary Art at Virginia Commonwealth University, and the Indiana University Bloomington Fine Arts Library. In addition, his work is held in the permanent collections of the Poster House, the New York Center for Book Arts, and the Letterform Archive.

In 2015, Kennedy was honored as a United States Artists Glasgow Fellow in Crafts and received a $50,000 unrestricted prize. He was named the Individual Laureate by the American Printing History Association in 2021, and the Outstanding Printmaker Awardee from the Mid Atlantic Print Council in 2022.

== Archival Collections ==
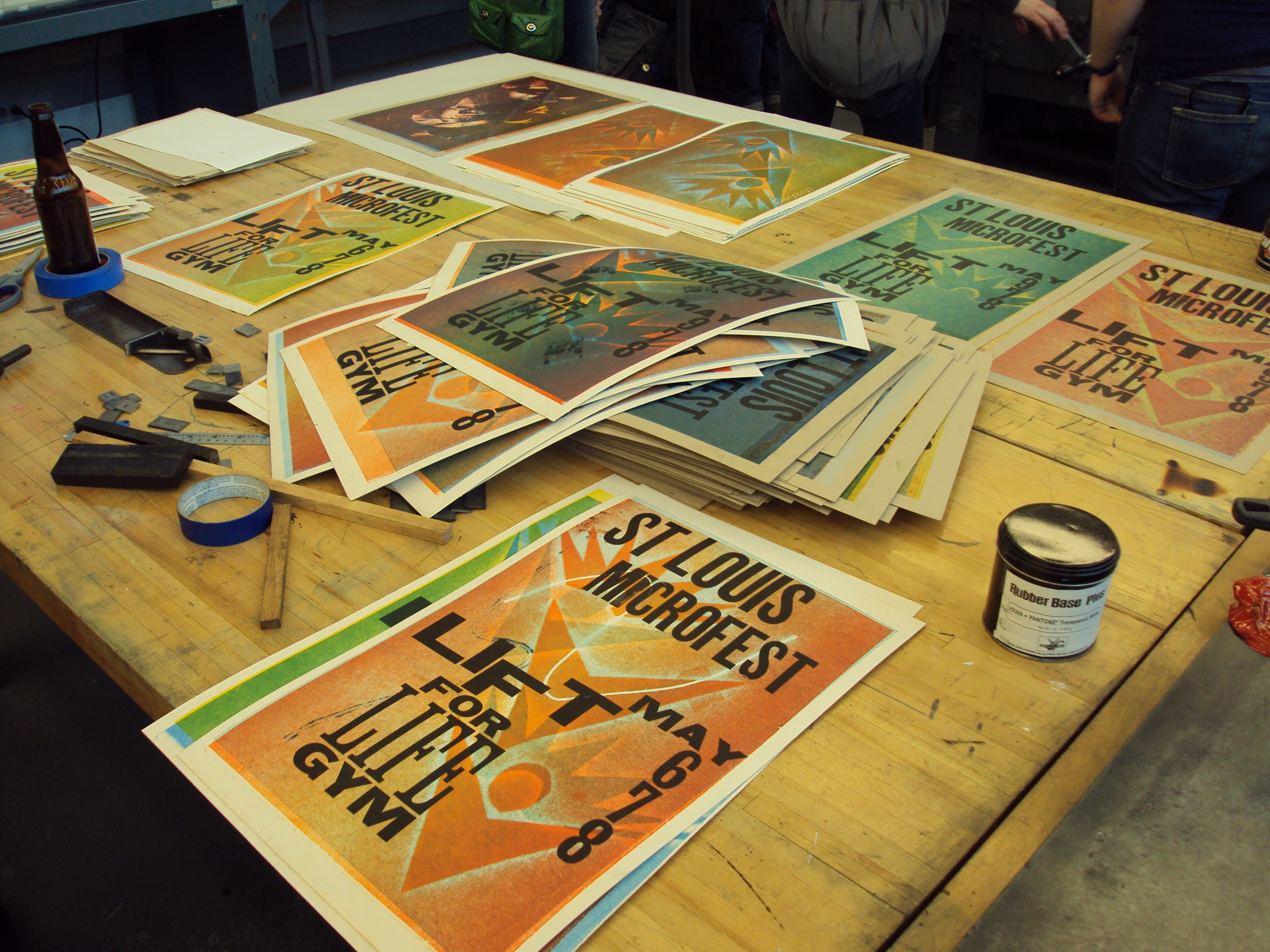
Letterpress posters by Amos Paul Kennedy Jr.

- Amos Kennedy Print Collection, Library of Congress Prints and Photographs Division Washington, D.C. Collection of posters and prints cover social subjects of Civil Rights, presidential campaigns, voting, performing arts (music, film, theater), art, books, handcrafts etc. 286 items.
- Kennedy & Sons Collection, Emory University, Stuart A. Rose Manuscript, Archives, and Rare Book Library, Atlanta, GA. Collection from Kennedy & Sons, Fine Printers (African American commercial printing business), 1990–2015, 6.5 linear ft. (11 boxes) and oversized papers.
- Amos Paul Kennedy Jr. collection Printers, UC Santa Barbara Library, Special Collection, Santa Barbara, California. Letterpress posters, broadsides, postcards, fans, publications and clippings, 1997–2013, 50.62 linear feet.
- Amos Paul Kennedy, Jr. collection, Rare Book and Manuscript Library, University of Illinois at Urbana-Champaign, Urbana, IL. Letterpress prints including posters, business cards, broadsides, fans, and maps as well as publications and clippings, 2000–2019, 17 boxes.
- Amos Paul Kennedy Jr. ephemera collection, Modern Manuscripts and Archives, the Newberry Library. Letterpress posters, paper fans, broadsides, greetings cards, and other ephemera dating from 1990 through approximately 2012. 2.7 linear feet, 2 boxes.
- The Letterpress Posters of Amos Kennedy, Poster House Permanent Collection. Curated by Angelina Lippert, installed by John F. Lynch and Robert Leonardi, graphically installed by Keith Immediato, and exhibition designed by Ola Baldych.

== Selected bibliography ==
- Kennedy Jr., Amos Paul (1992), How Wisdom Came to the World, Jubilee Press (Oak Park, Illinois), OCLC 29590990
- Kennedy Jr., Amos Paul (1994), Strange Fruit: Words Protesting Lynchings and Burnings, Jubilee Press (Oak Park, Illinois), OCLC 30697930
- Kennedy Jr., Amos Paul (1995), 67 children murdered in Chicagoland in 1994, OCLC 56896180
- Kennedy Jr., Amos Paul (1996), Juneteenth day 1996 : freedom, OCLC 55081932
- Kennedy Jr., Amos Paul (1997), Generosity, Jubilee Press (Oak Park, Illinois), OCLC 37211424
- Kennedy Jr., Amos Paul (2000), Kwanzaa is a way of life that we celebrate! (miniature book), OCLC 47211040
- Kennedy Jr., Amos Paul (2000), Mask, OCLC 44900076
- Kennedy Jr., Amos Paul (2001), I build books for the glory of my peoples!, ARLIS/NA series, no. 4., Kennedy & Sons, Fine Printers, OCLC 47203674
- Campos, Alexander; Kennedy Jr., Amos Paul (2009), Racism: An American Family Value (exhibit catalog), The Center for Book Arts, OCLC 689066693
- Kennedy Jr., Amos Paul (2024), Citizen Printer, Letterform Archive Books, OCLC 1453476113
