= Debrilla Ratchford =

American inventor

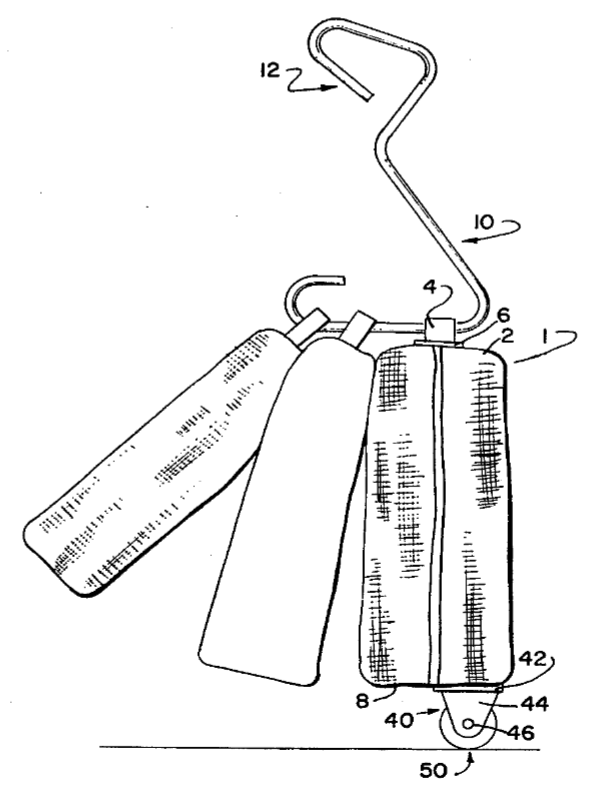
Ratchford's original drawing for her rolling suitcase patent

Debrilla M. Ratchford is an African-American inventor who is known for her patent on rolling luggage.

== Life and career ==
Ratchford was born in Washington, D.C. in the early 1950s. Her father was a retired Air Force officer. She attended Central Missouri State College before serving as a flight attendant for United Airlines. In her role, she saw pilots and passengers struggling with luggage, including an incident at O'Hare International Airport where an elastic strap securing suitcases on a set of wheels had broken which injured a traveler's eye. This incident catalyzed her work to solve this problem. In 1978, she was granted a patent for a luggage system to attach multiple luggage handles with a J-shaped hook in conjunction with a wheel carrier. Ratchford expanded on previous inventions that had added wheels onto suitcase bottoms to make them properly wheelable. The modern rolling suitcase is adapted from Ratchford's original design.
