= Bainbridge Island Museum of Art =

Museum in Bainbridge Island, Washington, U.S.

- Logo

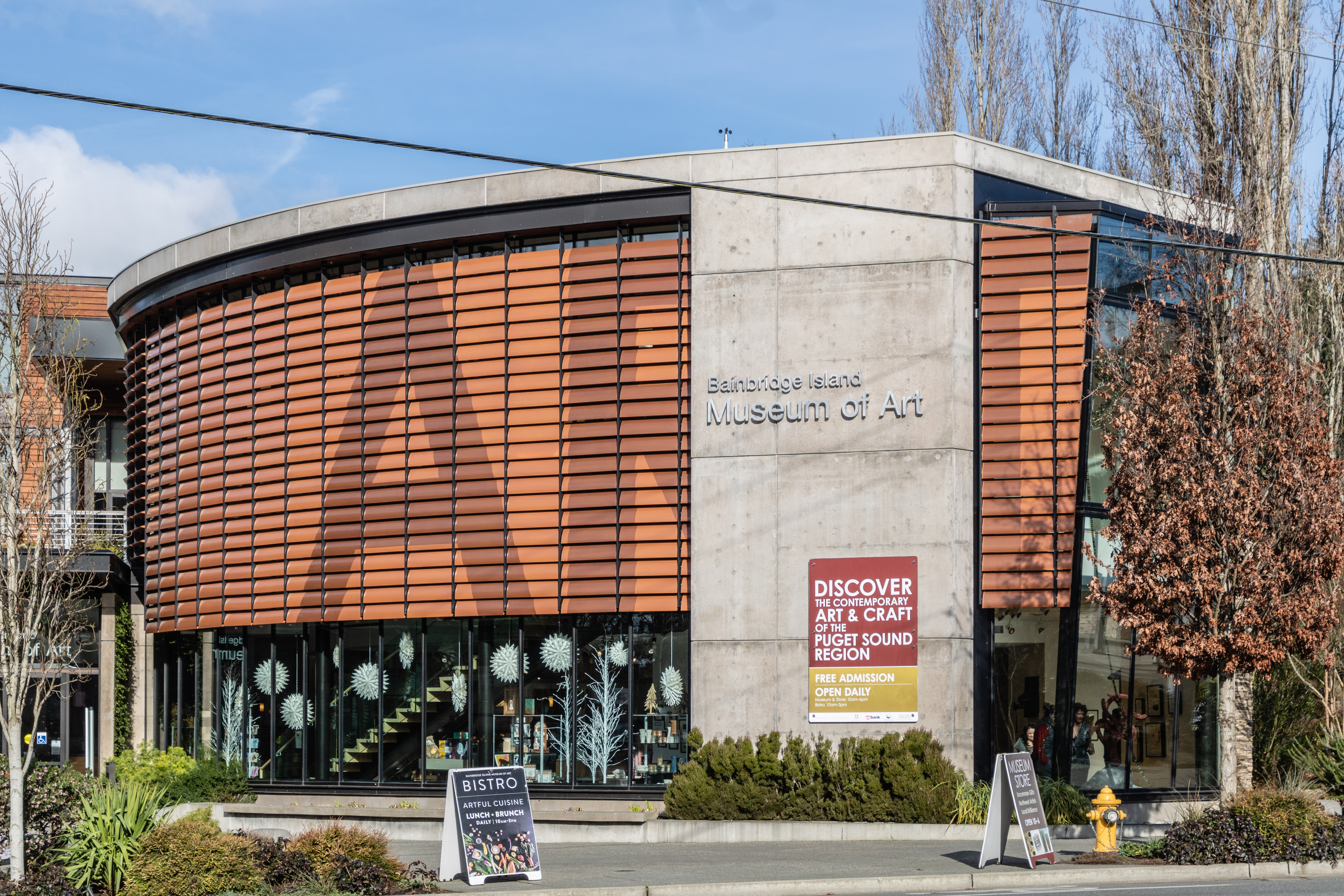
- The museum's exterior, 2019
- Established: 2013
- Location: Bainbridge Island, Washington, U.S.
- Coordinates: 47.6251°N 122.5145°W
- Website: biartmuseum.org

The Bainbridge Island Museum of Art (BIMA) is located in Bainbridge Island, Washington, United States. The museum was designed by Coates Design Architects and opened in 2013.

During its first weeks, the museum averaged 150 daily visitors and included an exhibition of works by Roger Shimomura. BIMA has also showcased works by Amos Paul Kennedy Jr. and George Tsutakawa.

Sheila Hughes was the executive director, as of 2018. BIMA launched a biennial artistic award program in 2023.
