= Rainelle, West Virginia =

- Town
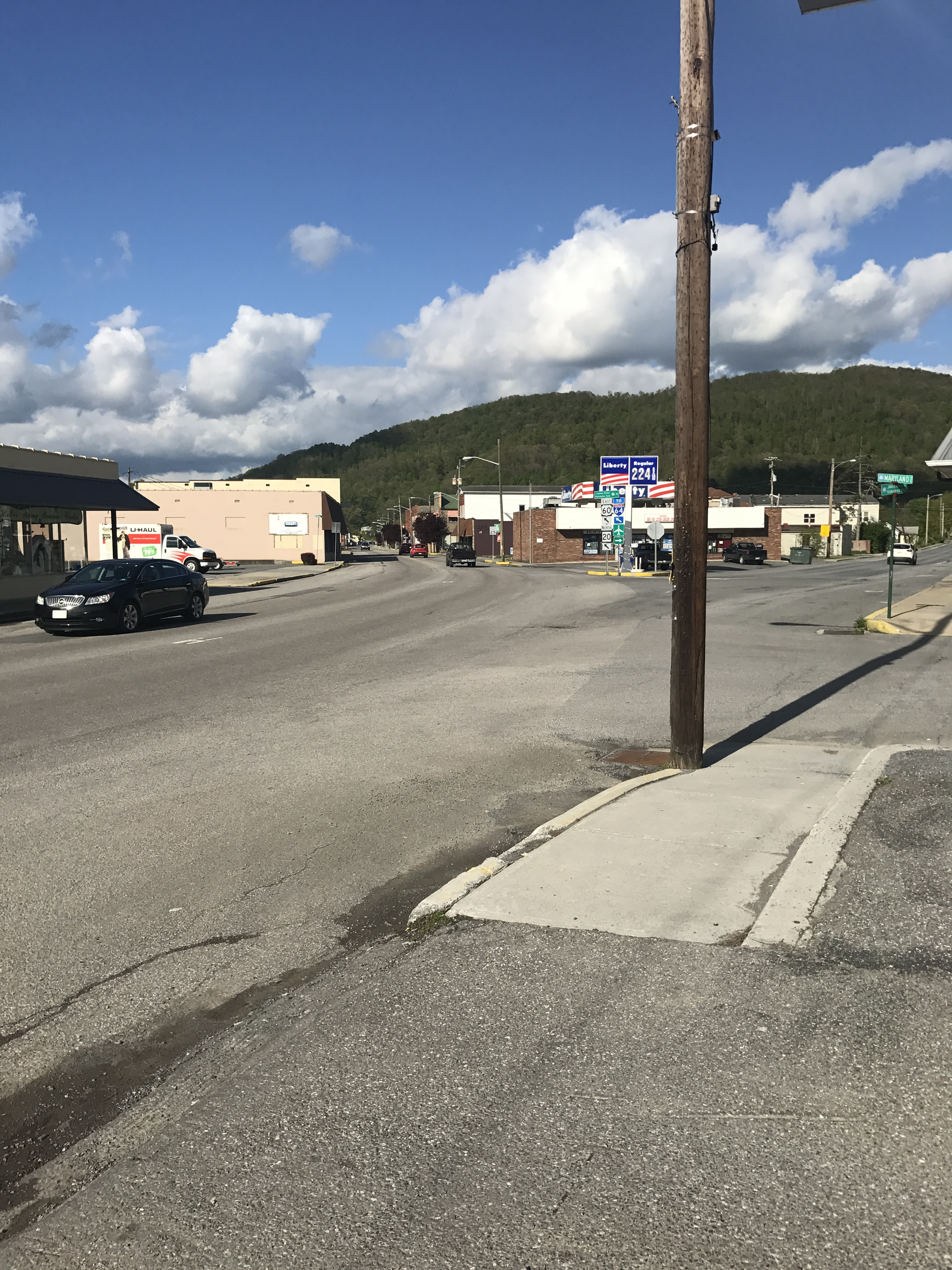
- Motto: "A Town Built to Carry On"
- Location of Rainelle in Greenbrier County, West Virginia.
- Coordinates: 37°58′04″N 80°46′18″W
- Country: United States
- State: West Virginia
- County: Greenbrier
- Incorporated: April 25, 1913

Government
  - Type: City/Town
  - Mayor: Robin Williams
  - Council: Ron Fleshman, Howard Randy Pendleton, David Spitzer, Monica S. Venable, Gary Harris

Area
  - Total: 1.12 sq mi (2.89 km^{2})
  - Land: 1.11 sq mi (2.88 km^{2})
  - Water: 0.0039 sq mi (0.01 km^{2})
- Elevation: 2,395 ft (730 m)

Population (2020)
  - Total: 1,190
  - Density: 1,365.8/sq mi (527.34/km^{2})
- Time zone: UTC-5 (Eastern (EST))
  - Summer (DST): UTC-4 (EDT)
- Zip code(s): 25962
- Area codes: 304/681
- FIPS code: 54-66652
- GNIS feature ID: 2391381
- Website: https://townofrainellewv.gov/

Rainelle is a town on the western edge of Greenbrier County, West Virginia, United States. It sits at the base of Sewell Mountain and Sims Mountain, and is bisected by the Meadow River. The only means of transportation to and from Rainelle are roads; primarily US 60 and WV 20, which merge on the western end of the town, and the James River and Kanawha Turnpike, which enters from the south. The population was 1,190 at the 2020 census.

== History ==
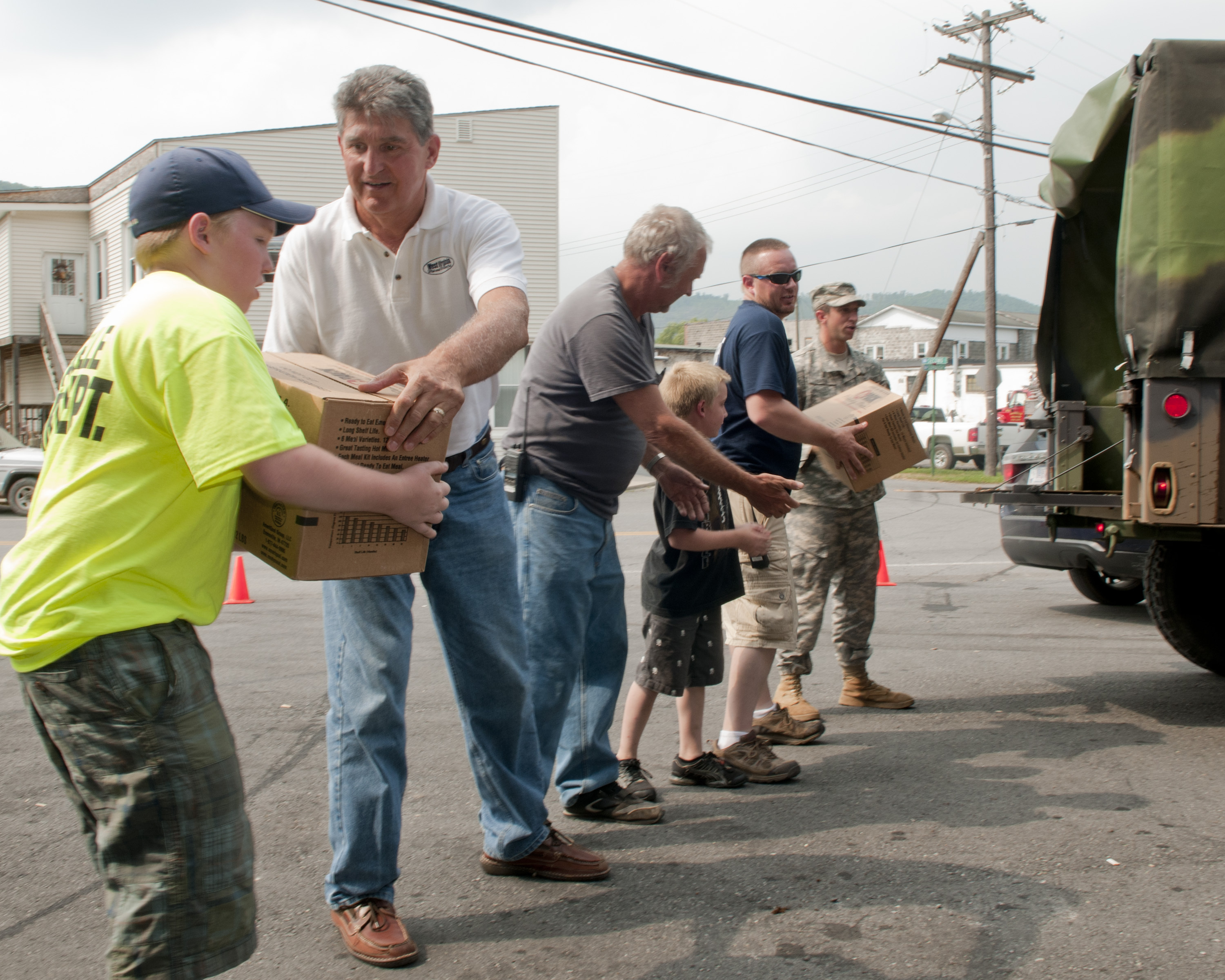
Army National Guard delivers water after a severe storm in 2012

The valley and community that contain and predates Rainelle is named Sewell Valley after Stephen Sewell, a scout that settled in the area in the 1750s. The community west of the Meadow River first applied for the name Rainielle in honor of the Rainielle family but was turned down by the Post Office Department. They adopted the name Rainelle in 1909. Thomas W. Raine and his brother John moved to the location from Pennsylvania in 1906 to harvest a large stand of hardwoods for building homes, etc. Their Meadow River Lumber Company operated for 60 years, and at one time was the largest hardwood sawmill in the world. In 1970, the owners sold it to Georgia-Pacific Corporation, which tore it down in 1975.

The town has suffered from several natural disasters in the last decade: most notable of these have been the June 2012 North American derecho, Hurricane Sandy, and the 2016 West Virginia flood. Rebuilding and demolition of structures damaged in the 2016 flood was still in progress in January 2020. Homes rebuilt with funds from the federal Hazard Mitigation Grant program were required to be sited two feet above the 100-year floodplain.

== Geography ==
According to the United States Census Bureau, the town has a total area of 1.11 square miles (2.87 km^{2}), all land.

The Meadow River flows through the town in a westerly direction on its way to eventually join the Gauley River.

The Midland Trail, now part of U.S. Route 60, runs through the town.

== Demographics ==
Historical population
Census	Pop.	Note	%±
1920	566		—
1930	920		62.5%
1940	985		7.1%
1950	2,408		144.5%
1960	649		−73.0%
1970	1,826		181.4%
1980	1,983		8.6%
1990	1,681		−15.2%
2000	1,545		−8.1%
2010	1,505		−2.6%
2020	1,190		−20.9%
U.S. Decennial Census

=== 2010 census ===
As of the census of 2010, there were 1,505 people, 675 households, and 387 families living in the town. The population density was 1,355.9 inhabitants per square mile (523.5/km^{2}). There were 806 housing units at an average density of 726.1 per square mile (280.3/km^{2}). 4The racial makeup of the town was 96.9% White, 0.7% African American, 0.2% Native American, 0.3% Asian, 0.3% from other races, and 1.7% from two or more races. Hispanic or Latino of any race were 0.7% of the population.

There were 675 households, of which 25.9% had children under the age of 18 living with them, 37.6% were married couples living together, 16.0% had a female householder with no husband present, 3.7% had a male householder with no wife present, and 42.7% were non-families. 36.6% of all households were made up of individuals, and 18.8% had someone living alone who was 65 years of age or older. The average household size was 2.14 and the average family size was 2.76.

The median age in the town was 45.3 years. 19.7% of residents were under the age of 18; 6.3% were between the ages of 18 and 24; 23.6% were from 25 to 44; 26.8% were from 45 to 64; and 23.5% were 65 years of age or older. The gender makeup of the town was 44.7% male and 55.3% female.

=== 2000 census ===
As of the census of 2000, there were 1,545 people, 696 households, and 421 families living in the town. The population density was 1,402.3 inhabitants per square mile (541.4 inhabitants/km^{2}). There were 802 housing units at an average density of 727.9 per square mile (281.0/km^{2}). The racial makeup of the town was 97.22% White, 0.71% African American, 1.17% Native American, 0.13% Asian, and 0.78% from two or more races. Hispanic or Latino of any race were 0.65% of the population.

There were 696 households, out of which 23.4% had children under the age of 18 living with them, 43.1% were married couples living together, 13.6% had a female householder with no husband present, and 39.5% were non-families. 36.5% of all households were made up of individuals, and 19.1% had someone living alone who was 65 years of age or older. The average household size was 2.14 and the average family size was 2.78.

In the town, the population was spread out, with 18.4% under the age of 18, 8.4% from 18 to 24, 21.8% from 25 to 44, 26.7% from 45 to 64, and 24.7% who were 65 years of age or older. The median age was 46 years. For every 100 females, there were 82.4 males. For every 100 females age 18 and over, there were 77.2 males.

The median income for a household in the town was $19,491, and the median income for a family was $26,528. Males had a median income of $22,000 versus $14,900 for females. The per capita income for the town was $14,069. About 23.8% of families and 28.7% of the population were below the poverty line, including 42.3% of those under age 18 and 14.9% of those age 65 or over.

== Notable person ==
- Rainelle has produced one Major League Baseball player, Cincinnati Reds pitcher Arnold Carter.

== Landmark ==
- Rainelle is home to the Rainelle Methodist Church, the largest structure in the world built entirely out of American Chestnut wood.
