= Rupert, West Virginia =

- Town
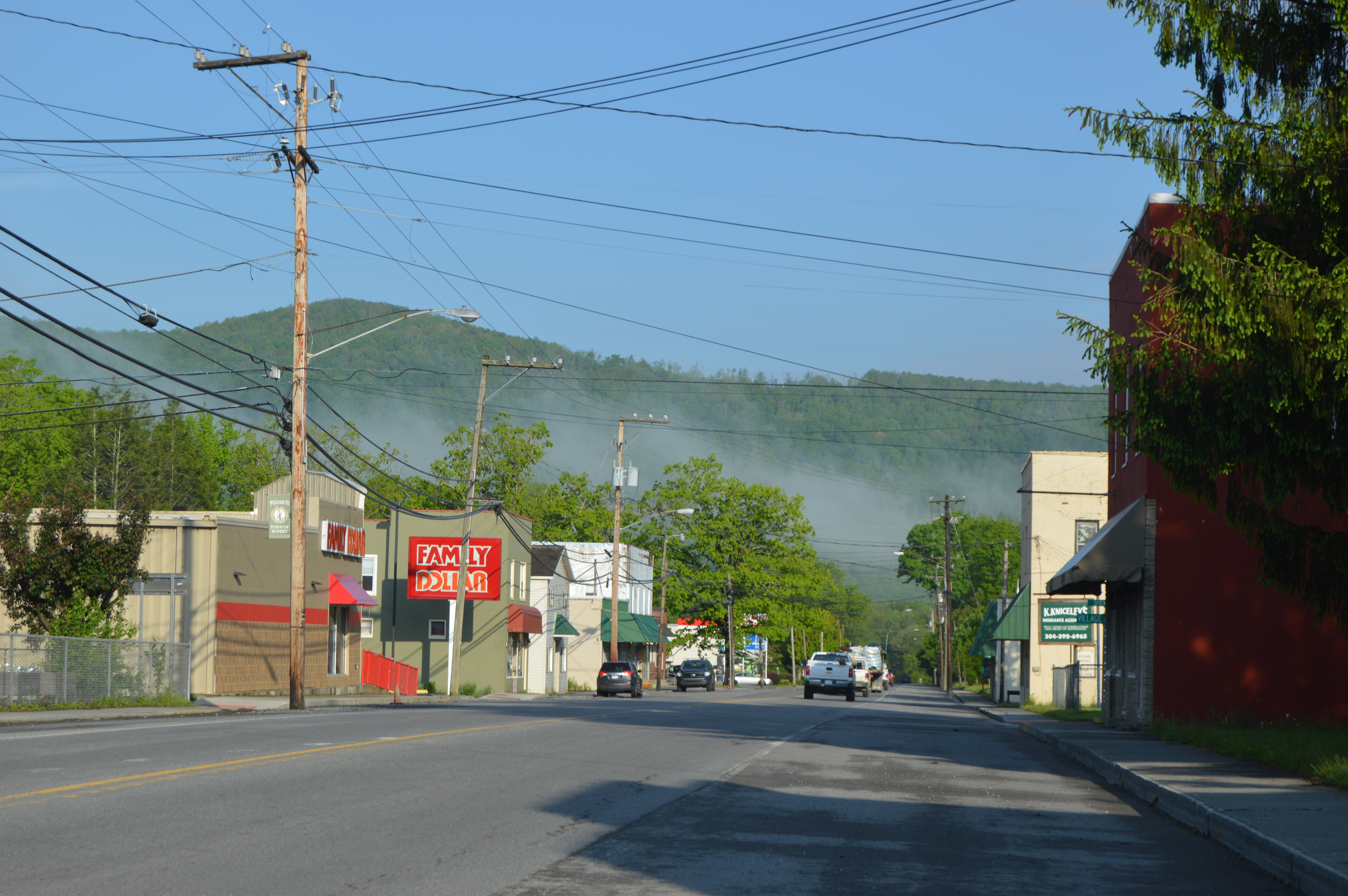
- Nicholas Street (U.S. Route 60)

- Location of Rupert in Greenbrier County, West Virginia.
- Coordinates: 37°57′54″N 80°41′13″W
- Country: United States
- State: West Virginia
- County: Greenbrier

Area
  - Total: 0.78 sq mi (2.03 km^{2})
  - Land: 0.77 sq mi (1.99 km^{2})
  - Water: 0.015 sq mi (0.04 km^{2})
- Elevation: 2,425 ft (739 m)

Population (2020)
  - Total: 877
  - Estimate (2021): 867
  - Density: 1,164.9/sq mi (449.78/km^{2})
- Time zone: UTC-5 (Eastern (EST))
  - Summer (DST): UTC-4 (EDT)
- ZIP code: 25984
- Area code: 304
- FIPS code: 54-70828
- GNIS feature ID: 2391398
- Website: local.wv.gov/rupert/Pages/default.aspx

Rupert is a town in Greenbrier County, West Virginia, United States. The population was 881 at the 2020 census.

== History ==
Cyrus A. Rupert first came to Greenbrier County, circa 1829, when he was seventeen years old. Cyrus, the seventh of eleven children, was born at Point Pleasant on October 7, 1812. His parents were Henry Rupert and Naomi Henkle Rupert. Apparently, Cyrus chose to go to Greenbrier County to be with his brothers, Gideon and Paul, who were running a general store at Clintonville. Cyrus' father, Henry, died in 1835 and most of the family, including Gideon, then migrated westward to Pekin, Illinois. Paul moved to Louisville, Kentucky, but Cyrus chose to stay in Greenbrier County. Why Cyrus and his brothers came to Greenbrier County is not known. However, there were Henkles in the area and were possibly related to their mother.

Cyrus became friends with Andrew McClung and it is probably through him that Cyrus began to acquire property near the mouth of Big Clear Creek. This property became the basis for a settlement that would later become Rupert, West Virginia.

== Geography ==
According to the United States Census Bureau, the town has a total area of 0.79 square miles (2.05 km^{2}), of which 0.77 square miles (1.99 km^{2}) is land and 0.02 square miles (0.05 km^{2}) is water.

== Climate ==
Climate data for Rupert, West Virginia, 1991–2020 normals, extremes 1989–present: 3319ft (1012m)
Month	Jan	Feb	Mar	Apr	May	Jun	Jul	Aug	Sep	Oct	Nov	Dec	Year
Record high °F (°C)	67 (19)	71 (22)	81 (27)	83 (28)	89 (32)	88 (31)	94 (34)	91 (33)	89 (32)	86 (30)	76 (24)	70 (21)	94 (34)
Mean maximum °F (°C)	56.0 (13.3)	59.6 (15.3)	68.8 (20.4)	78.3 (25.7)	81.9 (27.7)	83.1 (28.4)	84.9 (29.4)	84.5 (29.2)	82.7 (28.2)	76.3 (24.6)	67.7 (19.8)	56.7 (13.7)	86.4 (30.2)
Mean daily maximum °F (°C)	34.2 (1.2)	37.8 (3.2)	46.4 (8.0)	58.7 (14.8)	67.1 (19.5)	73.1 (22.8)	76.6 (24.8)	75.9 (24.4)	70.5 (21.4)	60.0 (15.6)	47.8 (8.8)	38.1 (3.4)	57.2 (14.0)
Daily mean °F (°C)	26.4 (−3.1)	29.2 (−1.6)	37.4 (3.0)	48.4 (9.1)	56.9 (13.8)	63.8 (17.7)	67.3 (19.6)	66.6 (19.2)	60.9 (16.1)	50.1 (10.1)	39.2 (4.0)	30.7 (−0.7)	48.1 (8.9)
Mean daily minimum °F (°C)	18.6 (−7.4)	20.6 (−6.3)	28.3 (−2.1)	38.0 (3.3)	46.8 (8.2)	54.5 (12.5)	58.1 (14.5)	57.4 (14.1)	51.3 (10.7)	40.2 (4.6)	30.5 (−0.8)	23.3 (−4.8)	39.0 (3.9)
Mean minimum °F (°C)	−2.3 (−19.1)	1.8 (−16.8)	8.0 (−13.3)	19.6 (−6.9)	31.3 (−0.4)	42.8 (6.0)	48.9 (9.4)	47.6 (8.7)	37.0 (2.8)	24.2 (−4.3)	12.9 (−10.6)	5.4 (−14.8)	−5.9 (−21.1)
Record low °F (°C)	−25 (−32)	−14 (−26)	−3 (−19)	9 (−13)	21 (−6)	33 (1)	44 (7)	38 (3)	27 (−3)	15 (−9)	0 (−18)	−12 (−24)	−25 (−32)
Average precipitation inches (mm)	4.09 (104)	4.02 (102)	5.09 (129)	4.43 (113)	5.58 (142)	4.78 (121)	5.41 (137)	4.18 (106)	3.92 (100)	3.14 (80)	3.98 (101)	4.72 (120)	53.34 (1,355)
Average snowfall inches (cm)	22.3 (57)	24.3 (62)	17.5 (44)	4.2 (11)	0.0 (0.0)	0.0 (0.0)	0.0 (0.0)	0.0 (0.0)	0.0 (0.0)	0.6 (1.5)	4.5 (11)	20.0 (51)	93.4 (237.5)
Average extreme snow depth inches (cm)	11.3 (29)	14.0 (36)	10.7 (27)	2.3 (5.8)	0.1 (0.25)	0.0 (0.0)	0.0 (0.0)	0.0 (0.0)	0.0 (0.0)	0.5 (1.3)	2.7 (6.9)	8.0 (20)	19.7 (50)
Average precipitation days (≥ 0.01 in)	16.9	14.5	14.8	13.7	14.3	12.9	12.3	11.2	8.9	9.8	11.1	15.0	155.4
Average snowy days (≥ 0.1 in)	9.2	7.7	5.7	1.7	0.0	0.0	0.0	0.0	0.0	0.4	2.2	7.3	34.2
Source 1: NOAA
Source 2: XMACIS (snowfall, temp records & monthly max/mins)

== Demographics ==
Historical population
Census	Pop.	Note	%±
1950	952		—
1960	921		−3.3%
1970	1,027		11.5%
1980	1,276		24.2%
1990	1,104		−13.5%
2000	940		−14.9%
2010	942		0.2%
2020	877		−6.9%
2021 (est.)	867	▼	−1.1%
U.S. Decennial Census

=== 2010 census ===
As of the census of 2010, there were 942 people, 431 households, and 243 families living in the town. The population density was 1,223.4 inhabitants per square mile (472.4/km^{2}). There were 509 housing units at an average density of 661.0 per square mile (255.2/km^{2}). The racial makeup of the town was 98.8% White, 0.4% African American, 0.1% Native American, 0.1% from other races, and 0.5% from two or more races. Hispanic or Latino of any race were 1.1% of the population.

There were 431 households, of which 24.6% had children under the age of 18 living with them, 39.0% were married couples living together, 13.2% had a female householder with no husband present, 4.2% had a male householder with no wife present, and 43.6% were non-families. 39.4% of all households were made up of individuals, and 17.6% had someone living alone who was 65 years of age or older. The average household size was 2.19 and the average family size was 2.94.

The median age in the town was 44.8 years. 21.4% of residents were under the age of 18; 6.2% were between the ages of 18 and 24; 22.7% were from 25 to 44; 28.9% were from 45 to 64; and 20.8% were 65 years of age or older. The gender makeup of the town was 48.9% male and 51.1% female.

=== 2000 census ===
As of the census of 2000, there were 940 people, 402 households, and 254 families living in the town. The population density was 1,214.9 inhabitants per square mile (471.3/km^{2}). There were 482 housing units at an average density of 623.0 per square mile (241.7/km^{2}). The racial makeup of the town was 97.34% White, 1.28% African American, 0.43% Native American, 0.21% from other races, and 0.74% from two or more races. Hispanic or Latino of any race were 0.74% of the population.

There were 402 households, out of which 27.4% had children under the age of 18 living with them, 49.8% were married couples living together, 11.2% had a female householder with no husband present, and 36.6% were non-families. 32.1% of all households were made up of individuals, and 16.7% had someone living alone who was 65 years of age or older. The average household size was 2.27 and the average family size was 2.86.

In the town, the population was spread out, with 21.8% under the age of 18, 7.8% from 18 to 24, 24.6% from 25 to 44, 26.1% from 45 to 64, and 19.8% who were 65 years of age or older. The median age was 42 years. For every 100 females, there were 84.7 males. For every 100 females age 18 and over, there were 77.5 males.

The median income for a household in the town was $20,250, and the median income for a family was $26,932. Males had a median income of $20,662 versus $17,159 for females. The per capita income for the town was $11,554. About 19.9% of families and 25.2% of the population were below the poverty line, including 33.8% of those under age 18 and 20.1% of those age 65 or over.

== Notable person ==
- Max Hayslette (1929-2024), painter, exhibit designer and graphic artist
