= Greenbrier County, West Virginia =

County in West Virginia, United States

Greenbrier County
- County
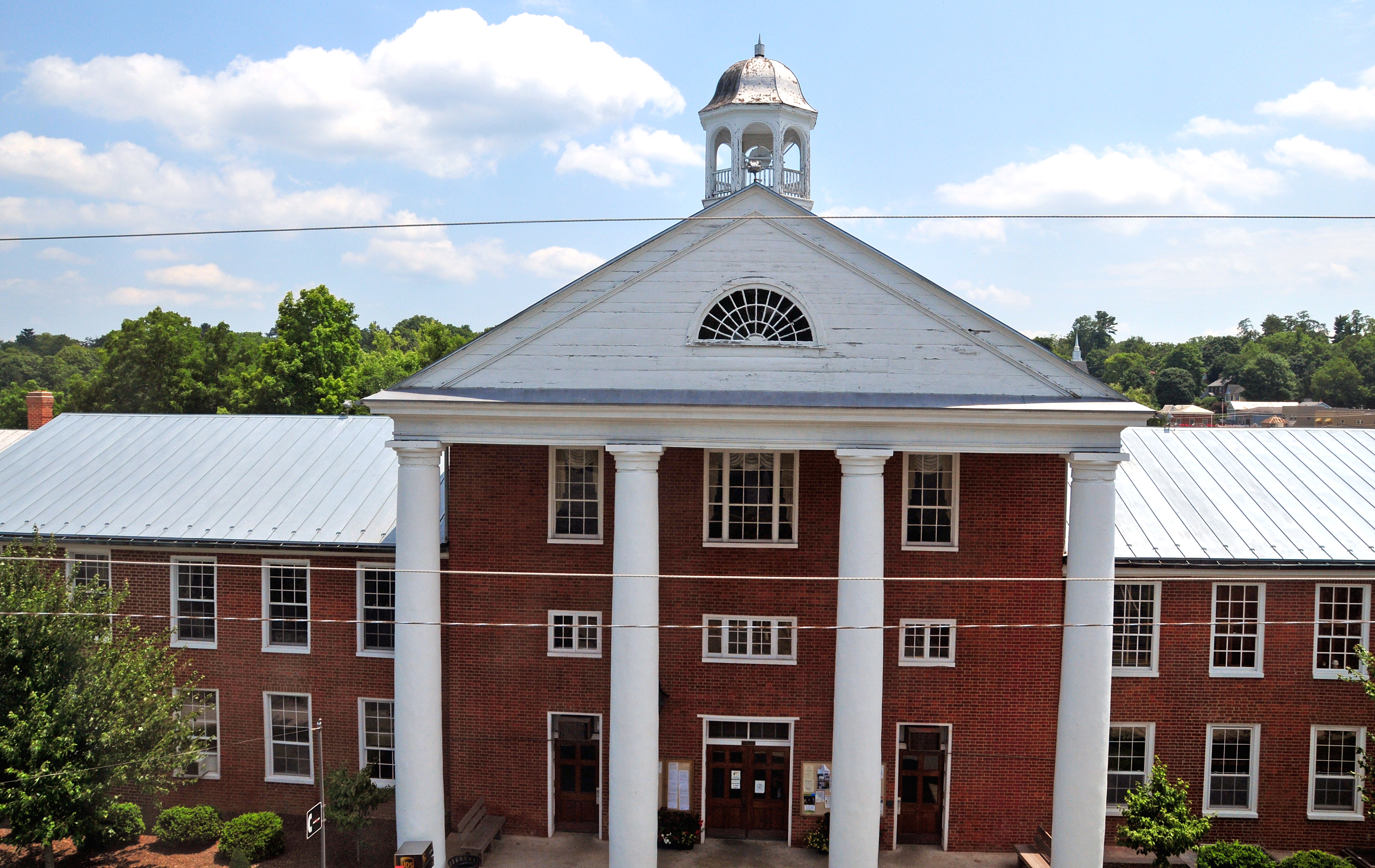
- Greenbrier County Courthouse in Lewisburg

- Seal

- Location of Greenbrier County in West Virginia

- West Virginia's location within the U.S.
- Coordinates: 37.95°N 80.47°W
- Country: United States
- State: West Virginia
- Founded: October 20, 1778
- Named for: Greenbrier River
- Seat: Lewisburg
- and largest town

Government
  - County Commission President: Lowell Rose (R)
  - County Commission: Richie Holliday (R); Tammy Tincher (R)

Area
  - Total: 1,025 sq mi (2,650 km^{2})
  - Land: 1,020 sq mi (2,600 km^{2})
  - Water: 4.9 sq mi (13 km^{2}) 0.5%
  - Rank: 2nd

Population (2020)
  - Total: 32,977
  - Estimate (2025): 31,578 ▼
  - Rank: 16th
  - Density: 32.3/sq mi (12.5/km^{2})
- Time zone: UTC−5 (Eastern)
  - Summer (DST): UTC−4 (EDT)
- Area codes: 304, 681
- Congressional district: 1st
- Senate district: 10th
- House of Delegates districts: 46th, 47th, 48th
- Website: https://greenbriercounty.net/

Greenbrier County (/ˈɡriːnbraɪ.ər/) is a county in the U.S. state of West Virginia. As of the 2020 census, the population was 32,977. Its county seat is Lewisburg. The county was formed in 1778 from Botetourt and Montgomery Counties in Virginia.

Greenbrier County is, in terms of total area, the second largest county in West Virginia, only behind Randolph County.

== History ==
Prior to the arrival of European-American settlers around 1740, Greenbrier County, like most of West Virginia, was used as a hunting ground by the Shawnee and Cherokee nations. They called this land Can-tuc-kee.

Shawnee leaders, including Pucksinwah and later his son Tecumseh, were alarmed by the arrival of the European settlers, who by 1771 had set up extensive trade in the area. The day books of early merchants Sampson and George Mathews recorded sales to the Shawnee that included such luxury items as silk, hats, silver, and tailor-made suits. Shawnee leaders feared the loss of their hunting lands, which were vital to their survival. They believed the white settlers would continue to encroach on their territory downriver on the Ohio.

Confrontations, sometimes violent, increased between the Native Americans and settlers. In 1774, the Earl of Dunmore, then governor of the colonies of New York and Virginia, decided to raise an army of 3,000 men to attack the Shawnees in their homeland in present-day Ohio. Half of these men were inducted at Fort Pitt, while the other half assembled at Fort Union under the command of General Andrew Lewis. The town of present-day Lewisburg developed around the fort and was named for that commander. By early October of that year, Lewis' force had marched downstream to the mouth of the Kanawha River. They fought the Battle of Point Pleasant against a Shawnee force led by Hokoleskwa, also known as Cornstalk. This site later developed as the town of Point Pleasant, West Virginia.

European settlers were subjected to a number of raids by Native Americans during the colonial period, including a raid on Fort Randolph and later on Fort Donnally, then inhabited by 25 men and 60 women and children. One of the heroic defenders of Fort Donnally was an African American slave named Dick Pointer. Pointer, said to have been nearly 7 feet (2.1 m) tall, defended the log door with Philip Hamman, giving the settlers enough time to awaken and defend themselves. Pointer later addressed the Virginia General Assembly and gave a moving appeal that "in the decline of life" he requested to be freed for his defense of Fort Donnally. Historic accounts differ as to whether the legislature granted his wish. His grave is marked beside Carnegie Hall in the county seat of Lewisburg, and a historical marker stands prominently in the midst of the Lewisburg Cemetery. Pointer's gun is on permanent display at The Greenbrier Historical Society and John A. North House Museum in Lewisburg.

During the secession crisis of 1861 Greenbrier citizens chose Samuel Price as their delegate to the Richmond convention. On April 17, 1861, the day Virginia's secession ordinance was passed he voted against it, but later changed his mind and signed the official document. When the public vote on the secession ordinance was held on May 23, 1861, Greenbrier county voted 1,000 to 100 in favor of secession. The Civil War came to the county in mid 1861, and several battles were fought in the area, including Lewisburg in May 1862 and White Sulphur Springs in August 1863. Both battles were Union victories. Greenbrier County became part of the new state of West Virginia, although it never participated in any of the votes held by the Restored Government in Wheeling. West Virginia contributed approximately 20,000 men to the Union and an equal amount to the Confederate army, with approximately 2,000 men from Greenbrier county joining the Confederate army.

In 1863, West Virginia's counties were divided into civil townships, with the intention of encouraging local government. This proved impractical in the heavily rural state, and in 1872 the townships were converted into magisterial districts. Greenbrier County was initially divided into ten townships: Anthony's Creek, (Note: "Anthony Creek" after 1880.) Big Levels, Blue Sulphur, Falling Spring, (Note: Occasionally "Falling Springs".) Fort Spring, Irish Corner, Lewisburg, Meadow Bluff, White Sulphur, and Williamsburg. Lewisburg District was co-extensive with the town of Lewisburg until 1871, when Big Levels Township was divided between Lewisburg and Falling Spring Townships. The same year, Summers County was formed from parts of Greenbrier, Fayette, Mercer, and Monroe Counties. The portion of Greenbrier County that became part of Summers County belonged to Blue Sulphur Township. In 1872, the nine remaining townships became magisterial districts. A tenth district, Frankford, was created from part of Falling Spring District between 1910 and 1920. In the 1990s the ten historic magisterial districts were consolidated into three new districts: Eastern, Western, and Central.

What is claimed to be the oldest golf course in the United States was founded in 1884 just north of White Sulphur Springs by the Montague family.

The famous "Greenbrier Ghost" trial occurred at Greenbrier County Courthouse in Lewisburg. Zona Heaster Shue, the wife of Edward Shue, was found dead in her home at Livesay’s Mill on January 23, 1897. The coroner initially listed her cause of her death as "everlasting faint", then as "childbirth." Shue's mother, Mary Jane Heaster, testified in court that her daughter's ghost had visited her on four separate occasions, claiming that her neck had been broken by her husband, who had strangled her in a fit of rage. Shue's body was exhumed and an autopsy was performed at Nickell Schoolhouse near the cemetery. Based on the results of an autopsy, Edward Shue was tried and convicted of murder. A historical marker located along U.S. Route 60 at Sam Black Church describes it as the "[o]nly known case in which testimony from [a] ghost helped convict a murderer."

During the decade prior to World War II, several Civilian Conservation Corps (CCC) camps were located along the Greenbrier River.

For most of the 20th century, the Meadow River Lumber Company operated the world's largest hardwood sawmill in Rainelle.

During World War II The Greenbrier hotel was used as a military hospital. Sections were used as an internment center for Axis diplomats who were stranded in the United States during the war. When the war ended, the military returned the hotel to private control, and it re-opened as a hotel. During the years of the Cold War, a large underground bunker was built beneath a section of new construction at the hotel, to serve as a secret Congressional refuge in case of nuclear attack. It was one of the sites to be used as part of the United States Continuity of Operations Plan. After it was reported in a 1992 article, following the fall of the Soviet Union, the US government decommissioned it as a government site.

In the June 2016 floods that affected the state of West Virginia, Greenbrier County suffered 16 casualties, the most of any county.

== Geography ==
According to the United States Census Bureau, the county has a total area of 1,025 square miles (2,650 km^{2}), of which 1,020 square miles (2,600 km^{2}) is land and 4.9 square miles (13 km^{2}) (0.5%) is water. It is the second-largest county in West Virginia by area.

Much of the area of the northern and western parts of the county is either public (Monongahela National Forest), coal land, or private forest, owned by companies such as MeadWestvaco and CSX.

In 2005, Invenergy, LLC of Chicago Illinois announced plans to build the $300 million, 124-turbine Beech Ridge Wind Farm along the tops of several Greenbrier County mountains. The wind farm would produce 186 megawatts of electricity. Development, which was originally expected to begin in late 2007, was stalled when the state Supreme Court agreed to hear the case brought by opponents of the project. Ultimately, The Supreme Court ruled in favor of the developers, clearing the way for construction to begin in the summer of 2009. However, in July of that year, a U.S. District Court in Maryland agreed to hear a case filed by opponents.

=== Adjacent counties ===
- Alleghany County, Virginia (southeast)
- Bath County, Virginia (east)
- Fayette County (west)
- Nicholas County (northwest)
- Monroe County (south)
- Pocahontas County (northeast)
- Summers County (southwest)
- Webster County (north)

=== National and state protected areas ===
- Greenbrier State Forest
- George Washington and Jefferson National Forests (WV/VA Line)
- Lost World Caverns
- Monongahela National Forest (part)
- Organ Cave System

== Demographics ==
Historical population
Census	Pop.	Note	%±
1790	6,015		—
1800	4,345		−27.8%
1810	5,914		36.1%
1820	7,041		19.1%
1830	9,006		27.9%
1840	8,695		−3.5%
1850	10,022		15.3%
1860	12,211		21.8%
1870	11,417		−6.5%
1880	15,060		31.9%
1890	18,034		19.7%
1900	20,683		14.7%
1910	24,833		20.1%
1920	26,242		5.7%
1930	35,878		36.7%
1940	38,520		7.4%
1950	39,295		2.0%
1960	34,446		−12.3%
1970	32,090		−6.8%
1980	37,665		17.4%
1990	34,693		−7.9%
2000	34,453		−0.7%
2010	35,480		3.0%
2020	32,977		−7.1%
2025 (est.)	31,578	▼	−4.2%
U.S. Decennial Census; 1790–1960 1900–1990; 1990–2000 2010–2020

=== 2020 census ===
As of the 2020 census, the county had a population of 32,977. Of the residents, 19.3% were under the age of 18 and 24.5% were 65 years of age or older; the median age was 47.3 years. For every 100 females there were 94.6 males, and for every 100 females age 18 and over there were 92.0 males.

The racial makeup of the county was 92.1% White, 2.4% Black or African American, 0.2% American Indian and Alaska Native, 0.6% Asian, 0.7% from some other race, and 4.0% from two or more races. Hispanic or Latino residents of any race comprised 1.7% of the population.

There were 14,414 households in the county, of which 24.6% had children under the age of 18 living with them. Of these households, 42.5% were married couples living together, 28.8% had a female householder with no spouse or partner present, and 20.6% had a male householder with no spouse present; about 32.6% of all households were made up of individuals and 16.4% had someone living alone who was 65 years of age or older.

The average household and family size was 2.8.

There were 17,807 housing units, of which 19.1% were vacant. Among occupied housing units, 73.7% were owner-occupied and 26.3% were renter-occupied. The homeowner vacancy rate was 2.4% and the rental vacancy rate was 11.1%.

The median income for a household in the county was $48,662 and the poverty rate was 20.7%.

Greenbrier County, West Virginia – Racial and ethnic composition Note: the US Census treats Hispanic/Latino as an ethnic category. This table excludes Latinos from the racial categories and assigns them to a separate category. Hispanics/Latinos may be of any race.
Race / ethnicity (NH = Non-Hispanic)	Pop 2000	Pop 2010	Pop 2020	% 2000	% 2010	% 2020
White alone (NH)	32,632	33,330	30,199	94.71%	93.94%	91.57%
Black or African American alone (NH)	1,041	973	766	3.02%	2.74%	2.32%
Native American or Alaska Native alone (NH)	111	88	55	0.32%	0.24%	0.16%
Asian alone (NH)	64	142	192	0.18%	0.40%	0.58%
Pacific Islander alone (NH)	2	8	5	0.00%	0.02%	0.01%
Other race alone (NH)	17	20	88	0.04%	0.05%	0.26%
Mixed race or Multiracial (NH)	350	497	1,101	1.01%	1.40%	3.33%
Hispanic or Latino (any race)	236	422	571	0.68%	1.18%	1.73%
Total	34,453	35,480	32,977	100.00%	100.00%	100.00%

=== 2010 census ===
As of the 2010 United States census, there were 35,480 people, 15,443 households, and 9,903 families residing in the county. The population density was 34.8 inhabitants per square mile (13.4/km^{2}). There were 18,980 housing units at an average density of 18.6 units per square mile (7.2 units/km^{2}). The racial makeup of the county was 94.6% white, 2.8% black or African American, 0.4% Asian, 0.3% American Indian, 0.4% from other races, and 1.5% from two or more races. Those of Hispanic or Latino origin made up 1.2% of the population. In terms of ancestry, 17.8% were Irish, 17.0% were German, 12.0% were English, and 10.0% were American.

Of the 15,443 households, 26.1% had children under the age of 18 living with them, 48.9% were married couples living together, 10.8% had a female householder with no husband present, 35.9% were non-families, and 30.6% of all households were made up of individuals. The average household size was 2.26 and the average family size was 2.79. The median age was 45.0 years.

The median income for a household in the county was $33,732 and the median income for a family was $43,182. Males had a median income of $34,845 versus $27,254 for females. The per capita income for the county was $20,044. About 14.7% of families and 19.4% of the population were below the poverty line, including 23.5% of those under age 18 and 13.6% of those age 65 or over.

=== 2000 census ===
As of the census of 2000, there were 34,453 people, 14,571 households, and 9,922 families residing in the county. The population density was 34 people per square mile (13 people/km^{2}). There were 17,644 housing units at an average density of 17 units per square mile (6.6 units/km^{2}). The racial makeup of the county was 95.23% White, 3.04% Black or African American, 0.34% Native American, 0.19% Asian, 0.01% Pacific Islander, 0.15% from other races, and 1.04% from two or more races. 0.68% of the population were Hispanic or Latino of any race.

There were 14,571 households, out of which 27.60% had children under the age of 18 living with them, 54.20% were married couples living together, 10.70% had a female householder with no husband present, and 31.90% were non-families. 28.60% of all households were made up of individuals, and 13.40% had someone living alone who was 65 years of age or older. The average household size was 2.32 and the average family size was 2.83.

In the county, the population was spread out, with 21.60% under the age of 18, 7.70% from 18 to 24, 26.10% from 25 to 44, 26.90% from 45 to 64, and 17.70% who were 65 years of age or older. The median age was 42 years. For every 100 females there were 92.50 males. For every 100 females age 18 and over, there were 88.80 males.

The median income for a household in the county was $26,927, and the median income for a family was $33,292. Males had a median income of $26,157 versus $19,620 for females. The per capita income for the county was $16,247. About 14.50% of families and 18.20% of the population were below the poverty line, including 23.70% of those under age 18 and 16.00% of those age 65 or over.

== Politics ==
Much like the state itself, the county has shifted further to the right since the start of the 21st Century with Bill Clinton being the last Democratic presidential candidate to win the county in 1996. It had still had gone for Democratic candidates on other elections until the mid to late 2010s such as the 2016 gubernatorial election, and in 2018 by Joe Manchin in the Senate race.

United States presidential election results for Greenbrier County, West Virginia
Year	Republican		Democratic		Third party(ies)	
Year	No.	%	No.	%	No.	%
1912	622	11.94%	2,707	51.96%	1,881	36.10%
1916	2,601	44.41%	3,170	54.12%	86	1.47%
1920	4,850	48.99%	4,994	50.45%	55	0.56%
1924	4,768	42.24%	6,048	53.58%	472	4.18%
1928	6,423	50.88%	6,141	48.65%	60	0.48%
1932	5,111	34.81%	9,467	64.47%	106	0.72%
1936	5,881	35.27%	10,738	64.41%	53	0.32%
1940	6,451	38.83%	10,164	61.17%	0	0.00%
1944	4,790	39.85%	7,231	60.15%	0	0.00%
1948	4,935	39.29%	7,598	60.48%	29	0.23%
1952	7,374	47.70%	8,086	52.30%	0	0.00%
1956	7,684	52.99%	6,817	47.01%	0	0.00%
1960	6,633	44.29%	8,343	55.71%	0	0.00%
1964	4,549	31.03%	10,112	68.97%	0	0.00%
1968	5,559	40.88%	6,318	46.46%	1,722	12.66%
1972	8,827	66.62%	4,423	33.38%	0	0.00%
1976	5,862	41.42%	8,291	58.58%	0	0.00%
1980	6,221	44.42%	7,128	50.90%	655	4.68%
1984	7,337	56.55%	5,599	43.16%	38	0.29%
1988	5,395	46.83%	6,091	52.87%	35	0.30%
1992	4,442	36.45%	5,784	47.46%	1,961	16.09%
1996	4,434	36.36%	6,286	51.55%	1,474	12.09%
2000	6,866	53.61%	5,627	43.93%	315	2.46%
2004	8,358	57.43%	6,084	41.81%	111	0.76%
2008	7,567	55.10%	5,881	42.83%	284	2.07%
2012	7,930	60.98%	4,710	36.22%	365	2.81%
2016	9,556	67.18%	3,765	26.47%	903	6.35%
2020	10,925	68.93%	4,655	29.37%	270	1.70%
2024	10,517	70.13%	4,196	27.98%	283	1.89%

== Law and government ==
Like all West Virginia counties, Greenbrier County is governed by a three-person, elected county commission. Other elected officers include the sheriff, county clerk, circuit clerk, assessor, prosecuting attorney, surveyor, two circuit judges, three magistrates, and a family court judge. There is also a five-member school board and six conservation district supervisors, with at least two from each county in the district.

=== Office holders ===
==== Board of Education ====
District	Holder	Party	Term expires
Central	Jeanie Wyatt (President)	non-partisan	2026
Central	Mary Humphreys (Vice-president)	non-partisan	2028
Eastern	Bob McClintic	non-partisan	2028
Eastern	Andrew Utterback	non-partisan	2026
Western	Paula Sanford-Dunford	non-partisan	2026

Board members are elected in non-partisan elections and serve four-year terms.

==== Commissioners ====
Office	Holder	Party	Term expires
Commissioner (President)	Lowell Rose	Republican	2031
Commissioner	Richie Holliday	Republican	2031
Commissioner	Tammy Tincher	Republican	2031
Commission Assistant	Kelly Banton		

Commissioners are elected to six-year terms.

==== Conservation District Supervisors ====
Office	Holder	Party	Term expires
Supervisor (Chairperson)	Gary Sawyers (Greenbrier)	non-partisan	2028
Supervisor (Vice-chair)	Timothy VanReenen (Pocahontas)	non-partisan	2028
Supervisor (Treasurer)	Gary Truex (Greenbrier)	non-partisan	2026
Supervisor	Donald McNeel (Pocahontas)	non-partisan	2028
Supervisor	Avery Atkins (Monroe)	non-partisan	2026
Supervisor	Carolyn Miller (Monroe)	non-partisan	2028

Greenbrier, along with Monroe and Pocahontas counties, is represented by the Greenbrier Valley district. At least two supervisors per county are elected during primaries and serve four-year terms.

==== Other county offices ====
Office	Holder	Party	Term expires
Assessor	Joe Darnell	Democrat	2028
Clerk	Robin Loudermilk	Republican	2028
Prosecuting Attorney	Nicole Graybeal	Republican	2028
Sheriff	Bart Baker	Republican	2028
Surveyor	Vacant		

The sheriff is limited to two consecutive four-year terms; the clerk serves six-year terms, and the prosecuting attorney and assessor each serve four-year terms.

=== Judicial ===
Greenbrier along with Pocahontas County is in the 29th Judicial Circuit.

==== Circuit Court ====
Division	Holder	Party	Term expires
1	Robert E. Richardson	Non-partisan	2032
2	Patrick I. Via	Non-partisan	2032
Clerk	Jamie L. Baker	Republican	2028

Circuit Court Judges are elected to eight-year terms. Clerks are elected to six-year terms.

==== Family Court ====
Office	Holder	Party	Term expires
Judge	R. Grady Ford	Non-partisan	2032

Greenbrier, and Monroe county make up the 15th Family Court Circuit. Judges are elected to eight-year terms.

==== Magistrate Court ====
Division	Holder	Party	Term expires
1	Timothy Stover	Non-partisan	2028
2	Kimberly Johnson	Non-partisan	2028
3	Kirby Hanson	Non-partisan	2028
Clerk	Jennifer Vance		

Magistrates are elected in non-partisan elections during primaries, and serve four-year terms.

=== State Legislature ===
Each county in West Virginia is represented by one or more House of Delegates members and state senators.

==== House of Delegates ====
District	Holder	Party	Term expires
46	Jeff Campbell	Republican	2026
47	Ray Canterbury	Republican	2026
48	Tom Clark	Republican	2026

Greenbrier County is represented by the 46th, 47th, and 48th District in the West Virginia House of Delegates. Delegates serve two-year terms with all of the seats in the House up for election every two years.

==== State Senate ====
Holder	Party	Term expires
Vince Deeds	Republican	2026
Jack Woodrum	Republican	2028

Greenbrier County is currently represented by West Virginia's 10th Senate district. Senators serve four-year terms with half of those seats up for election every two years.

=== Federal Representatives ===
==== United States House of Representatives ====
District	Holder	Party	Term expires
1st	Carol Miller	Republican	2027

Greenbrier County is represented in congress by the 1st congressional district of West Virginia.

==== United States Senate ====
Senator	Party	Term expires
Jim Justice	Republican	2031
Shelley Moore Capito	Republican	2027

== Education ==
=== Public schools ===
Greenbrier County Schools is the operating school system within Greenbrier County. The school system is governed by the Greenbrier County Board of Education, which is elected on a non-partisan basis. The Superintendent of Schools, who is appointed by the Board, provides administrative supervision for the system. The School Board Office is located on Church Street in Lewisburg. Following a trend in West Virginia, schools at the secondary level are consolidated, while elementary schools continue to be located within small communities.

- Alderson Elementary School
- Crichton Elementary School
- Eastern Greenbrier Middle School
- Frankford Elementary School
- Greenbrier East High School
- Greenbrier West High School
- Lewisburg Elementary School
- Rainelle Elementary School
- Ronceverte Elementary School
- Rupert Elementary School
- Smoot Elementary School
- Western Greenbrier Middle School
- White Sulphur Springs Elementary School

=== Private schools ===
- Greenbrier Community School (Formerly Greenbrier Episcopal School)
- Seneca Trail Academy
- Renick Christian School
- Lewisburg Baptist Academy

=== Former schools ===
- Alderson High/Jr. High School
- Altavista School
- Alvon/Neola School (Near White Sulphur Springs)
- Anthony Creek School
- Arbuckle School
- Baldwin School
- Balm of Gilead School
- Baker School
- Bethel School
- Big Clear Creek School
- Blue Sulphur Springs Junior High School
- Blue Swamp School
- Boling School
- Brown School
- Brushy Flat School
- Brushy Ridge School
- Burdett School
- Carol Hill School
- Central School
- Charity School
- Cherry Row School
- Charmco School
- Chestnut Grove School
- Chestnut Ridge School
- Coal Hollow School
- Coalbank School
- Clendenin School
- Cleveland School
- Crichton High/Jr. High
- Crawley School
- Curry School
- Dansie School
- Dougher School
- East Rainelle School
- Eckle School
- Edde School
- Edgewood School
- Fearnster School (Suspected to be a misspelling of Feamster)
- Forestdale School
- Frame School
- Frankford High/Jr. High School
- Friars Hill School
- Fry School
- Gabbert School
- George School
- Germany School
- Gilboa School
- Greenbrier Church/School (Bingham Mountain)
- Greenbrier High/Jr.High School (Ronceverte)
- Greenbrier School of Practical Nursing (campus of Greenbrier East High School)
- Greenbrier Valley School
- Hanger School
- Hawver School
- Hellem School
- Henning School
- Hillview School
- Holliday School
- Holliday-Lewis School
- Hopewell School
- Horseshoe Bend School
- Hull School
- Knapp School
- Kramer School
- McQueen School
- Laurel Hill School
- Lewis School
- Lewisburg Intermediate School
- Lewisburg Elem./Jr. High School (Lewisburg High/Jr./Elem.)
- Liberty School
- Livesay School
- Locust Spring School
- Lower Tuckahoe School
- May School
- Maple Grove School
- Meadowdale School
- Mill Creek School
- Mill Spring School
- Mount Lookout School
- Mount Prospect School
- Mount Vale School
- Mountain State High School
- Mountain View School
- Monroe Draft School
- Mt. Vernon School
- New Piedmont School
- Oak Grove School
- Oak View School
- Organ Cave School
- Pembroke School
- Perry School
- Persinger School
- Pine Grove School
- Pleasant Valley School
- Pleasant View School
- Rainelle Christian Academy (RCA)
- Rapp School
- Rainelle High/Jr. High School
- Renick High/Jr. High School
- Renick Elementary School
- Relihan School
- Rich Hollow School
- Rockcamp School
- Rupert High/Jr. High School
- Sawmill Hallow School
- Savannah School
- Sharp School
- Sims School
- Smoot High/Jr. High School
- Slabcamp School
- Snowflake School
- Solomon Springs School
- Spotts Ridge School
- State Flower School
- Sugar Grove School
- Thompson School
- Upper Little Creek School
- Vires School
- Westview School
- White Sulphur Springs High/Jr. High School
- White School
- Whiteoak Grove School
- Whites Draft School
- Williamsburg High/Jr. High School
- Williamsburg Elementary School
- Willard School
- Woodland School

=== Other ===
- Alternative/Home Schooling (County-wide)
- West Virginia State Virtual School

=== Colleges and universities ===
- New River Community and Technical College (NRCTC), Greenbrier Valley Campus
- West Virginia School of Osteopathic Medicine (WVSOM)

== Transportation ==
=== Airports ===
Greenbrier Valley Airport is a single runway airport 3 miles north of Lewisburg, West Virginia. Flights are provided by Contour Airlines.

=== Railroads ===
Amtrak, the national passenger rail service, provides service to White Sulphur Springs and Alderson under the Cardinal route.

=== Major highways ===
- Interstate 64
- U.S. Route 60
- U.S. Route 219
- West Virginia Route 12
- West Virginia Route 20
- West Virginia Route 39
- West Virginia Route 55
- West Virginia Route 63
- West Virginia Route 92

== Communities ==
=== Cities ===
- Lewisburg (county seat)
- Ronceverte
- White Sulphur Springs

=== Towns ===
- Alderson (Partially located in Monroe County)
- Falling Spring (Also known as Renick)
- Quinwood
- Rainelle
- Rupert

=== Census-designated place ===
- Fairlea

=== Magisterial districts ===
- Central
- Eastern
- Western

=== Tax districts ===
- Anthony's Creek – represented by Mayor Terry "Mountain" McLaughlin
- Blue Sulphur
- Falling Spring (sometimes Falling Springs)
- Fort Spring
- Frankfort
- Irish Corner
- Lewisburg (historically Big Levels)
- Meadow Bluff
- White Sulfur
- Williamsburg

== See also ==
- Beartown State Park
- Beech Ridge Wind Farm
- Greenbrier Hotel, (The)
- Greenbrier River
- Greenbrier River Trail
- John Stuart (Virginia)
- Meadow River
- Meadow River Lumber Company
- Monongahela National Forest
- National Register of Historic Places listings in Greenbrier County, West Virginia
- List of magisterial districts in West Virginia
