= List of Sigma Sigma Sigma chapters =

Sigma Sigma Sigma sorority has 98 active chapters.

== Chapters ==
Following is a list of Sigma Sigma Sigma chapters. Active chapters noted in bold, inactive chapters noted in italics. Chapters listed in order of founding.

Chapter	Charter date and range	Institution	City	State or province	Status	Ref.
**Alpha**	April 20, 1898	Longwood University	Farmville	Virginia	Active	
Beta	1903–1908	Lewisburg Female College (Note: This school is closed. Its property is now the Carnegie Hall regional cultural center, not to be confused with the more well-known Carnegie Hall in New York. The Lewisburg school had several names, eventually settling on Greenbrier College, which closed in 1972.)	Lewisburg	West Virginia	Inactive	
Gamma	1904–1911	Randolph-Macon Woman’s College (now Randolph College) (Note: Randolph-Macon Woman's College, now Randolph College, site of the former Gamma chapter should not be confused with Randolph–Macon College, site of the sorority's Theta Mu chapter.)	Lynchburg	Virginia	Inactive	
Delta	1904–1911	George Peabody College (Vanderbilt) (Note: Peabody had been the teacher preparation branch of the former University of Nashville until 1889 when it was released to operate independently. The school was later moved to land adjacent to Vanderbilt in hopes of increased cooperation. The two schools merged under the Vanderbilt name in 1979.)	Nashville	Tennessee	Inactive	
Epsilon	1905–1914	Hollins College	Hollins	Virginia	Inactive	
Eta	1905–1907	Galloway Woman's College (Hendrix College) (Note: Also known as Searcy Female, Galloway Women's College was absorbed by Hendrix College in 1933.)	Searcy	Arkansas	Inactive	
Alpha Delta	1905–1911	Southwestern University	Georgetown	Texas	Inactive	
Theta	1906–1907	Hood College	Frederick	Maryland	Inactive	
Sigma Phi	1909–1924	Union University	Jackson	Tennessee	Inactive	
Kappa	1911–1931, 1950–1993	Miami University	Oxford	Ohio	Inactive	
Zeta	1911–1954	Buffalo State University	Buffalo	New York	Inactive	
Phi	1912–1932	Ohio University	Athens	Ohio	Inactive	
**Lambda**	1915–1919, 1928	Indiana University of Pennsylvania	Indiana County	Pennsylvania	Active	
Iota	1915–1940, 1947–1984	University of Northern Colorado	Greeley	Colorado	Inactive	
**Mu**	1915	Truman State University	Kirksville	Missouri	Active	
**Nu**	1915	University of Central Missouri	Warrensburg	Missouri	Active	
Xi	1915–1963	Northwestern Oklahoma State University	Alva	Oklahoma	Inactive	
**Omicron**	1917	Eastern Michigan University	Ypsilanti	Michigan	Active	
**Pi**	1917	Emporia State University	Emporia	Kansas	Active	
Rho	1920–1931, 1960–1990, 1993–1999	Florida State University	Tallahassee	Florida	Inactive	
Tau	1921–1961	New Mexico Highlands University	Las Vegas	New Mexico	Inactive	
Upsilon	1922–1957	East Central University	Ada	Oklahoma	Inactive	
**Chi**	1922–1954, 1956	Pittsburg State University	Pittsburg	Kansas	Active	
**Psi**	1922	Marshall University	Huntington	West Virginia	Active	
Sigma	1925–1982	Western Colorado University	Gunnison	Colorado	Inactive	
Omega			reserved		Memorial	
**Alpha Alpha**	1925	Concord University	Athens	West Virginia	Active	
**Alpha Beta**	1925–1947, 1975–1981, 1992	Kent State University	Kent	Ohio	Active	
**Alpha Gamma**	1925–2005, 2015	Fort Hays State University	Hays	Kansas	Active	
Alpha Delta (Pennsylvania)	1926–1973, 2012–2020	Drexel University	Philadelphia	Pennsylvania	Inactive	
**Alpha Epsilon**	1927	Northwest Missouri State University	Maryville	Missouri	Active	
**Alpha Zeta**	1928	Northwestern State University	Natchitoches	Louisiana	Active	
Alpha Eta	1928–1933	Butler University	Indianapolis	Indiana	Inactive	
**Alpha Theta**	1929	Radford University	Radford	Virginia	Active	
**Alpha Iota**	1929	Northeastern State University	Tahlequah	Oklahoma	Active	
Alpha Kappa	1930–1937, 1947–2013	Fairmont State University	Fairmont	West Virginia	Inactive	
Alpha Lambda	1930–1975	Harris Teachers College	St. Louis	Missouri	Inactive	
**Alpha Mu**	1931	University of Louisiana at Lafayette	Lafayette	Louisiana	Active	
Alpha Nu	1931–1978, 1986–2008	Southern Illinois University Carbondale	Carbondale	Illinois	Inactive	
**Alpha Xi**	1932	University of Wisconsin–Whitewater	Whitewater	Wisconsin	Active	
Alpha Omicron	1935–2005, 2008–2022	University of Central Arkansas	Conway	Arkansas	Inactive	
**Alpha Pi**	1935	Clarion University of Pennsylvania	Clarion	Pennsylvania	Active	
**Alpha Rho**	1935	Lock Haven University of Pennsylvania	Lock Haven	Pennsylvania	Active	
Alpha Sigma	1937–1985	University of Southern Mississippi	Hattiesburg	Mississippi	Inactive	
Alpha Tau	1938–1954	Wilson Teachers College	Washington	D.C.	Inactive	(Note: In 1977 this school merged into what is now the University of the District of Columbia.)
**Alpha Upsilon**	1939	James Madison University	Harrisonburg	Virginia	Active	
**Alpha Phi**	1942	Central Michigan University	Mount Pleasant	Michigan	Active	
**Alpha Chi**	1942	Murray State University	Murray	Kentucky	Active	
**Alpha Psi**	1942	Eastern Illinois University	Charleston	Illinois	Active	
Alpha Omega			unassigned			
**Beta Alpha**	1944	Northern Illinois University	DeKalb	Illinois	Active	
**Beta Beta**	1945–2007, 2013	Missouri State University	Springfield	Missouri	Active	
Beta Gamma	1945–2004	Ball State University	Muncie	Indiana	Inactive	
**Beta Delta**	1945–1948, 1960–1985, 1988	Shepherd University	Shepherdstown	West Virginia	Active	
**Beta Epsilon**	1946	Western Illinois University	Macomb	Illinois	Active	
Beta Zeta	1946–1953, 1980–1982	SUNY Cortland	Cortland	New York	Inactive	
Beta Eta	1946–1974	Henderson State University	Arkadelphia	Arkansas	Inactive	
Beta Iota	1947–1988	Minot State University	Minot	North Dakota	Inactive	
**Beta Theta**	1949–1964, 1977	University of Pittsburgh	Pittsburgh	Pennsylvania	Active	
Beta Kappa	1950–2001	Arizona State University	Phoenix	Arizona	Inactive	
Beta Lambda	1950–1987	University of Wisconsin–Milwaukee	Milwaukee	Wisconsin	Inactive	
**Beta Mu**	1950–1979, 2017	University of Central Oklahoma	Edmond	Oklahoma	Active	
Beta Nu	1951–1955	California State University, Fresno	Fresno	California	Inactive	
**Beta Xi**	1951	Southeast Missouri State University	Cape Girardeau	Missouri	Active	
Beta Pi	1952–2023	University of Wisconsin–Stout	Menomonie	Wisconsin	Inactive	
Beta Rho	1952–1995	Western Michigan University	Kalamazoo	Michigan	Inactive	
Beta Sigma	1953–1963	University of Tampa	Tampa	Florida	Inactive	
**Beta Tau**	1953	University of Detroit Mercy	Detroit	Michigan	Active	
Beta Omicron	1953–1959	Wayne State University	Detroit	Michigan	Inactive	
**Beta Upsilon**	1954–1969, 1989–2013, 2019	Pennsylvania State University	University Park	Pennsylvania	Active	
Beta Phi	1955–1975	Florida Southern College	Lakeland	Florida	Inactive	
Beta Chi	1956–1971	Queens College	Queens, NYC	New York	Inactive	
Beta Psi	1957–1981	Youngstown State University	Youngstown	Ohio	Inactive	
Beta Omega			unassigned			
Gamma Alpha	1957–1965, 1979–1987	University of Illinois	Champaign	Illinois	Inactive	
**Gamma Beta**	1960	East Carolina University	Greenville	North Carolina	Active	
Gamma Gamma	1960–1991	California University of Pennsylvania	California	Pennsylvania	Inactive	
Gamma Delta	1961–1989	Adrian College	Adrian	Michigan	Inactive	
Gamma Epsilon	1961–1971, 1978–1984	Creighton University	Omaha	Nebraska	Inactive	
**Gamma Zeta**	1961	Slippery Rock University of Pennsylvania	Slippery Rock	Pennsylvania	Active	
Gamma Eta	1962–1981	Loyola University	New Orleans	Louisiana	Inactive	
Gamma Theta	1962–1966	Bradley University	Peoria	Illinois	Inactive	
**Gamma Iota**	1963–1998, 2017	UMass Amherst	Amherst	Massachusetts	Active	
Gamma Kappa	1963–1997	Marietta College	Marietta	Ohio	Inactive	
**Gamma Lambda**	1963	University of Wisconsin–Eau Claire	Eau Claire	Wisconsin	Active	
**Gamma Mu**	1964	Southeastern Louisiana University	Hammond	Louisiana	Active	
Gamma Nu	1965–1982	St. Cloud State University	St. Cloud	Minnesota	Inactive	
**Gamma Xi**	1965	Barton College	Wilson	North Carolina	Active	
Gamma Omicron	1966–1972	University of Northern Iowa	Cedar Falls	Iowa	Inactive	
**Gamma Pi**	1967	Nicholls State University	Thibodaux	Louisiana	Active	
Gamma Rho	1967–1976, 1992–2023	Edinboro University of Pennsylvania	Edinboro	Pennsylvania	Inactive	
Gamma Sigma	1968–1974	University of Wisconsin–Superior	Superior	Wisconsin	Inactive	
Gamma Tau	1968–1989	West Virginia Institute of Technology	Montgomery	West Virginia	Inactive	
Gamma Upsilon	1969–1985	Marquette University	Milwaukee	Wisconsin	Inactive	
Gamma Phi	1969–2012	University of Wisconsin–River Falls	River Falls	Wisconsin	Inactive	
Gamma Chi	1969–1978	Tennessee Tech University	Cookeville	Tennessee	Inactive	
Gamma Psi	1969–2020	Morehead State University	Morehead	Kentucky	Inactive	
Gamma Omega			unassigned			
Delta Alpha	1970–1994	Glenville State University	Glenville	West Virginia	Inactive	
**Delta Beta**	1970	Elon University	Elon	North Carolina	Active	
Delta Gamma	1970–1980	University of Minnesota Morris	Morris	Minnesota	Inactive	
Delta Delta	1970–1989, 1996–2021	University of North Carolina	Chapel Hill	North Carolina	Inactive	
Delta Epsilon	1970–1979	Northern Michigan University	Marquette	Michigan	Inactive	
**Delta Zeta**	1971	Bloomsburg University of Pennsylvania	Bloomsburg	Pennsylvania	Active	
**Delta Eta**	1972–1986, 2015	University of Southern Indiana	Evansville	Indiana	Active	
Delta Theta	1974–2018	UNC Pembroke	Pembroke	North Carolina	Inactive	
Delta Iota	1975–1984	Valley City State University	Valley City	North Dakota	Inactive	
Delta Kappa	1977–1983	University of South Carolina	Columbia	South Carolina	Inactive	
Delta Lambda	1978–1983	Colorado Mesa University	Grand Junction	Colorado	Inactive	
Delta Mu	1978–1983	Rutgers University	New Brunswick	New Jersey	Inactive	
Delta Nu	1978–2005	Franklin & Marshall College	Lancaster	Pennsylvania	Inactive	
Delta Xi	1978–1984	Loyola Marymount University	Los Angeles	California	Inactive	
**Delta Omicron**	1979	Gettysburg College	Gettysburg	Pennsylvania	Active	
Delta Pi	1979–2022	Winthrop University	Rock Hill	South Carolina	Inactive	
Delta Rho	1979–1981	Averett University	Danville	Virginia	Inactive	
Delta Sigma	1980–1982	University of Oklahoma	Norman	Oklahoma	Inactive	
Delta Tau	1981–1987	Lincoln Memorial University	Harrogate	Tennessee	Inactive	
**Delta Upsilon**	1982	Widener University	Chester	Pennsylvania	Active	
Delta Phi	1982–1999	Kansas State University	Manhattan	Kansas	Inactive	
**Delta Chi**	1982	University of Virginia	Charlottesville	Virginia	Active	
**Delta Psi**	1983	Saint Joseph's University	Philadelphia	Pennsylvania	Active	
Delta Omega			unassigned			
**Epsilon Alpha**	1983	California State University, East Bay	Hayward	California	Active	
Epsilon Beta	1984–2025	University of Arkansas	Monticello	Arkansas	Inactive	
**Epsilon Gamma**	1984–2005, 2014	Grand Valley State University	Allendale Charter Township	Michigan	Active	
**Epsilon Delta**	1985	Gannon University	Erie	Pennsylvania	Active	
**Epsilon Epsilon**	1985	Stockton University	Galloway Township	New Jersey	Active	
**Epsilon Zeta**	1986	Southern Arkansas University	Magnolia	Arkansas	Active	
**Epsilon Eta**	1986	East Stroudsburg University	East Stroudsburg	Pennsylvania	Active	
**Epsilon Theta**	1987	Oglethorpe University	Brookhaven	Georgia	Active	
**Epsilon Iota**	1987	St. Mary's University	San Antonio	Texas	Active	
**Epsilon Kappa**	1987	University of Wisconsin–Oshkosh	Oshkosh	Wisconsin	Active	
Epsilon Lambda	1987–2010	Hofstra University	Hempstead (village)	New York	Inactive	
Epsilon Mu	1988–2014	Rowan University	Glassboro	New Jersey	Inactive	
**Epsilon Nu**	1989	UNC Greensboro	Greensboro	North Carolina	Active	
Epsilon Xi	1989–1993	Indiana University	Bloomington	Indiana	Inactive	
**Epsilon Omicron**	1989	Illinois State University	Normal	Illinois	Active	
**Epsilon Pi**	1990	Presbyterian College	Clinton	South Carolina	Active	
**Epsilon Rho**	1990	Minnesota State University, Mankato	Mankato	Minnesota	Active	
**Epsilon Sigma**	1991	Virginia Commonwealth University	Richmond	Virginia	Active	
**Epsilon Tau**	1991	Saint Leo University	St. Leo	Florida	Active	
**Epsilon Upsilon**	1991	Marist College	Poughkeepsie	New York	Active	
**Epsilon Phi**	1991	University of North Carolina Wilmington (UNCW)	Wilmington	North Carolina	Active	
**Epsilon Chi**	1991	Northeastern University	Boston	Massachusetts	Active	
**Epsilon Psi**	1991	Rochester Institute of Technology	Henrietta	New York	Active	
Epsilon Omega			unassigned			
**Zeta Alpha**	1991	Bryant University	Smithfield	Rhode Island	Active	
Zeta Beta	1991–2007	Cameron University	Lawton	Oklahoma	Inactive	
**Zeta Gamma**	1991	Southeastern Oklahoma State University	Durant	Oklahoma	Active	
**Zeta Delta**	1992	State University of New York at Oneonta	Oneonta	New York	Active	
Zeta Epsilon	1992–2017	Florida International University	University Park	Florida	Inactive	
Zeta Zeta	1992–1995	Sonoma State University	Sonoma County	California	Inactive	
**Zeta Eta**	1992	Winona State University	Winona	Minnesota	Active	
**Zeta Theta**	1992	Idaho State University	Pocatello	Idaho	Active	
Zeta Iota	1992–1995	Weber State University	Ogden	Utah	Inactive	
**Zeta Kappa**	1993	Montclair State University	Montclair	New Jersey	Active	
**Zeta Lambda**	1993	Wingate University	Wingate	North Carolina	Active	
Zeta Mu	1993–2014	University of Alaska Fairbanks	College	Alaska	Inactive	
Zeta Nu	1993–1998	University of Maryland, Baltimore County	Baltimore County	Maryland	Inactive	
Zeta Xi	1993–1995	Cumberland University	Lebanon	Tennessee	Inactive	
Zeta Omicron	1993–2011	Seton Hall University	South Orange	New Jersey	Inactive	
**Zeta Pi**	1994	Virginia Wesleyan University	Virginia Beach	Virginia	Active	
Zeta Rho	1994–2015	Johnson & Wales University	Providence	Rhode Island	Inactive	
Zeta Sigma	1994–2000	Duquesne University	Pittsburgh	Pennsylvania	Inactive	
**Zeta Tau**	1995	Missouri Western State University	St. Joseph	Missouri	Active	
**Zeta Upsilon**	1996	Fitchburg State University	Fitchburg	Massachusetts	Active	
Zeta Phi	1997–2000	San Francisco State University	San Francisco	California	Inactive	
**Zeta Chi**	1997–2021, 2024	Coastal Carolina University	Conway	South Carolina	Active	
Zeta Psi	1997–2026	The College of New Jersey	Ewing Township	New Jersey	Inactive	
Zeta Omega			unassigned			
Eta Alpha	1997–2020	Stephens College	Columbia	Missouri	Inactive	
**Eta Beta**	1997	Newberry College	Newberry	South Carolina	Active	
Eta Gamma	1997–2001	Eastern Washington University	Cheney	Washington	Inactive	
Eta Delta	1997–2005	North Carolina Wesleyan College	Rocky Mount	North Carolina	Inactive	
Eta Epsilon	1997–2009	Ringling College of Art and Design	Sarasota	Florida	Inactive	
**Eta Zeta**	1997	University of Alaska Anchorage	Anchorage	Alaska	Active	
**Eta Eta**	1998	Lynn University	Boca Raton	Florida	Active	
Eta Theta	1998–2026	Gustavus Adolphus College	St. Peter	Minnesota	Inactive	
Eta Iota	1999–2012	Defiance College	Defiance	Ohio	Inactive	
**Eta Kappa**	2000	Texas Woman's University	Denton	Texas	Active	
**Eta Lambda**	2001	Moravian University	Bethlehem	Pennsylvania	Active	
Eta Mu	2001–2002	University of Maryland- Mannheim, Germany	Mannheim	Germany	Inactive	
**Eta Nu**	2001	Ramapo College	Mahwah	New Jersey	Active	
**Eta Xi**	2002	Ursinus College	Collegeville	Pennsylvania	Active	
**Eta Omicron**	2002	Sam Houston State University	Huntsville	Texas	Active	
**Eta Pi**	2004	Metropolitan State University of Denver	Denver	Colorado	Active	
**Eta Rho**	2005	Georgia Southern University–Armstrong Campus	Savannah	Georgia	Active	
**Eta Sigma**	2005	Culver–Stockton College	Canton	Missouri	Active	
**Eta Tau**	2006	Embry–Riddle Aeronautical University	Daytona Beach	Florida	Active	
**Eta Upsilon**	2007	University of Lynchburg	Lynchburg	Virginia	Active	
Eta Phi	2008–2022	Pratt Institute	Brooklyn, NYC	New York	Inactive	
Eta Chi	2009–2023	University of Missouri	Columbia	Missouri	Inactive	
Eta Psi	2010–2019	St. John's University on Staten Island	Staten Island, NYC	New York	Inactive	
Eta Omega			unassigned			
**Theta Alpha**	2010	High Point University	High Point	North Carolina	Active	
Theta Beta	2010–2023	University of Michigan-Flint	Flint	Michigan	Inactive	
**Theta Gamma**	2011	McKendree University	Lebanon	Illinois	Active	
**Theta Delta**	2012	Lindenwood University	St. Charles	Missouri	Active	
Theta Epsilon	2013–2023	University of Nevada, Las Vegas	Paradise	Nevada	Inactive	
**Theta Zeta**	2014	Case Western Reserve University	Cleveland	Ohio	Active	
Theta Eta	2015–2022	Old Dominion University	Norfolk	Virginia	Inactive	
**Theta Theta**	2016	Oakland University	Auburn Hills	Michigan	Active	
**Theta Iota**	2016	Auburn University	Auburn	Alabama	Active	
**Theta Kappa**	2017	University of Wisconsin-La Crosse	La Crosse	Wisconsin	Active	
Theta Lambda	2018–2025	University of Illinois-Springfield	Springfield	Illinois	Inactive	
**Theta Mu**	2020	Randolph–Macon College	Ashland	Virginia	Active	
