= John A. North House =

Historic house in West Virginia, United States

- U.S. National Register of Historic Places
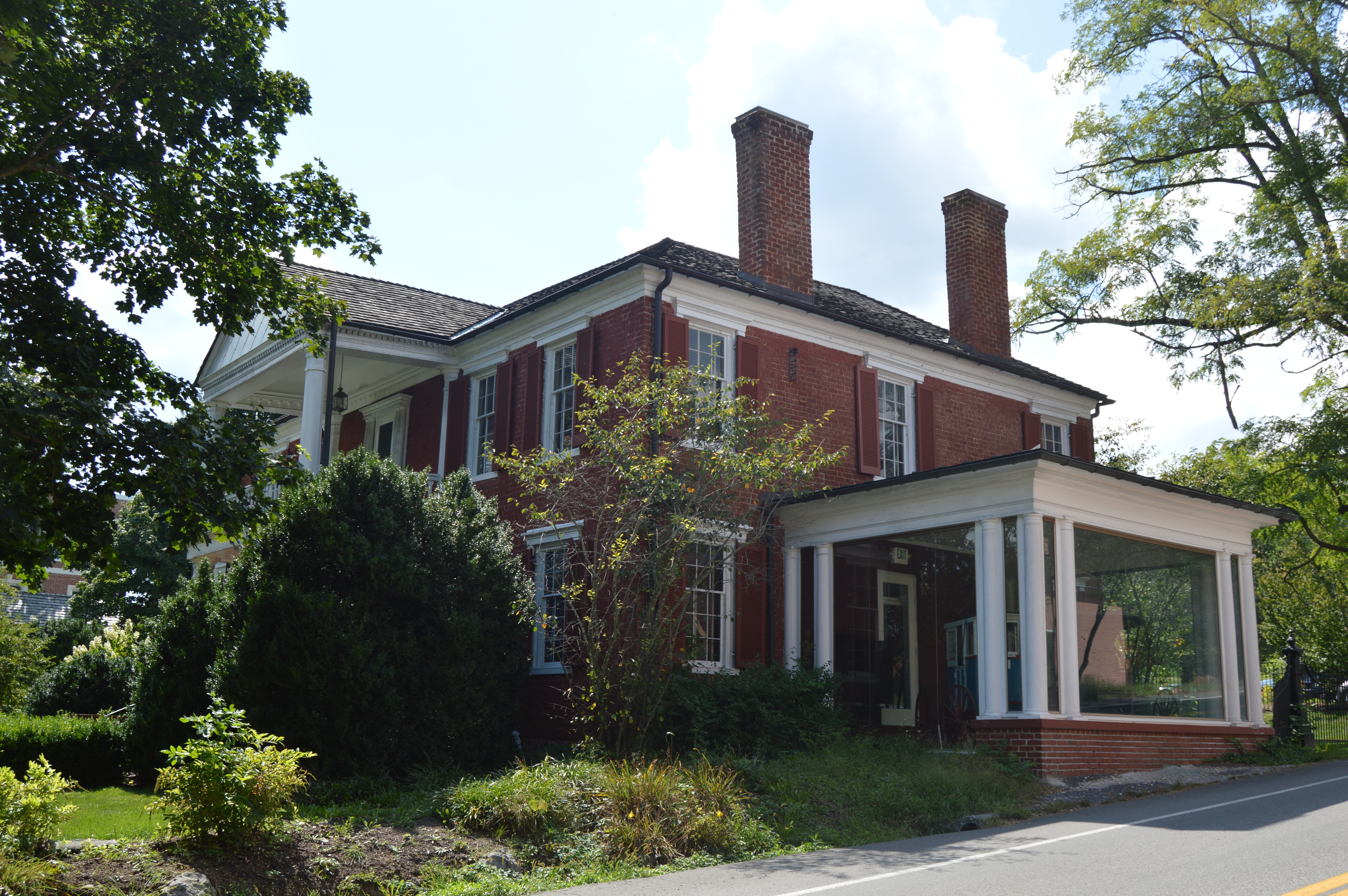
- Front and northern side

- Location within West Virginia Location within the United States
- Location: 301 West Washington St., Lewisburg, West Virginia
- Coordinates: 37°48′11″N 80°26′54″W
- Area: 0.8 acres (0.32 ha)
- Built: c. 1820
- NRHP reference No.: 74001998
- Added to NRHP: October 9, 1974

The John A. North House is a historic house museum and archives located in Lewisburg, Greenbrier County, West Virginia. Currently, the North House is Greenbrier County's only historic house museum. Since 1976, The Greenbrier Historical Society has operated within the North House, and in 1992 the North House was officially purchased by the Greenbrier Historical Society. In 1992, the home officially became known as "North House Museum, Greenbrier Historical Society."

== Early history ==
Map of Lewisburg in 1825 showing the North Property.

The North House was the original home of prominent local lawyer John A. North and his new wife Charlotte. Built in 1820, the North House was initially a two-story "L-shaped plan," Federal Style dwelling. The layout consisted of a foyer, an informal parlor (which would have been used only by the family), a formal parlor for entertaining guests, and a dining room. The upstairs would have mirrored the downstairs floor plans and would have been used by the family as sleeping quarters. The interior of the home was quite lavish for the 1820s, but the exterior was also exquisite. The North House features a double portico with heavy columns supporting a high pediment, and the English red clay bricks which were used in the exterior construction of the home were originally dug from the front lawn and fired in a kiln on the property. Once completed, the North House became one of Lewisburg's first two-story brick homes.

The North Family moved into the house in 1821 and lived there until 1836. The North family consisted of John A. North, his wife Charlotte, and their five daughters, Mary, Margaret, Isabella, Martha Jane, and Charlotte. The North's were a wealthy family with prominent status and owned at least three enslaved people at the North House. By 1850, John North held twelve people in slavery.

During his time in Lewisburg, John A. North was appointed Clerk of the Greenbrier District Court of Chancery, and Clerk of the District of Virginia Supreme Court of Appeals.

== Expansion ==
After the North Family had moved out of the home, the property was quickly purchased by a local man named James Frazer. By 1834, Frazer was already known in Lewisburg for building a two-story brick building which he leased to the Supreme Court of Appeals of Virginia. This building was conveniently located adjacent to the North House. After he had purchased the North House in 1836, Frazer and his family opened the Star Hotel. Frazer changed the original layout of the house and added two wings to the property. The new additions to the home allowed Frazer to establish a popular local restaurant and an affordable Inn with guest rooms for travelers, lawyers, and jurists to use while attending Court in the adjacent Court House. The Inn and Tavern also served as a popular "rest stop" for travelers along the James River and Kanawha Turnpike. James Frazer owned twenty-five enslaved people at his death in 1854. The enslaved people lived in cabins on the property and maintained and operated the inn and grounds.

After James Frazer's death in 1854, his son, James inherited the inn. When James Jr., died in 1860, his family continued to live there until they sold it in 1871 to Colonel Joe McPherson and once again became a private residence. Col. McPherson purchased the house for his daughter and son-in-law, Rebecca McPherson and John Harris, and the house underwent a "Victorian Era" make-over. One of the tavern wings which had been added by Frazer had been removed, and metal window hoods, gutters, segmented columns, and architectural embellishments were added to the façade of the home.

In 1905, the North House was sold to Dr. Robert L. Telford and his family. From 1890 to 1894, Dr. Telford pastored the Old Stone Church (Lewisburg, West Virginia), and then later became the President of the Lewisburg Female Institute, later renamed the Greenbrier College for Women. Telford later sold the house to Greenbrier College and it became the house for the Presidents of Greenbrier College.

Throughout the early decades of the 1900s, the North House underwent several changes in order to make it a modernized home. In 1925, the house underwent a major renovation. A two-story addition containing a sun-parlor and a porte-cochère were constructed; and closets, a new front door, the installation of central heating, and running water were also added to the home.

The North House has also housed the Lewisburg Seminary and Conservatory of Music. However, since 1976 the Greenbrier Historical Society has operated the North House Museum out of the home, and the Historical Society has officially owned the building since 1992.

Additionally, the North House was listed on the National Register of Historic Places in 1974.

== Museum ==
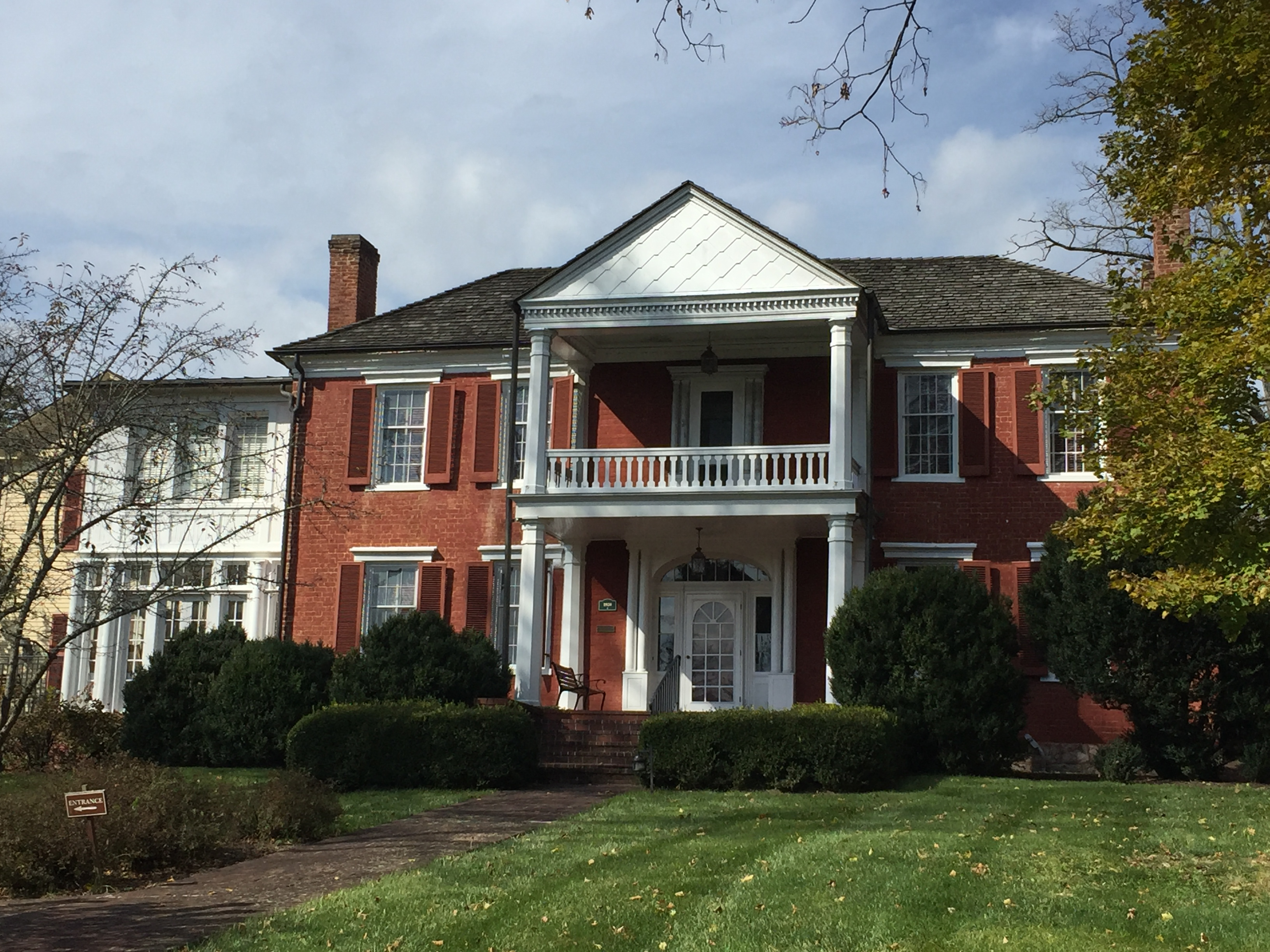
North House Museum in Fall 2018

The Greenbrier Historical Society and North House Museum is dedicated to collecting, preserving, and interpreting the rich history of the Greenbrier Valley. The museum's permanent displays and temporary exhibits feature items from across the Greenbrier Valley, including, but not limited to; the training saddle of General Robert E. Lee's horse Traveler, an 18th-century covered wagon, Civil War artifacts, furniture and textiles made by local craftsman and women, as well as items from the North family.

The Greenbrier Historical Society and North House Museum also offers educational programs, a research archive, tours of the town and cemeteries, and membership opportunities.
