= Pan Am Express =

Regional airline of the United States (1981–1991)

| IATA | ICAO | Call sign |
|---|---|---|
| PL | PNO | PAN EXPRESS |
- Commenced operations: 1981
- Ceased operations: December 4, 1991
- Operating bases: Berlin–Tegel; Detroit; Miami; New York–JFK
- Fleet size: See Fleet below
- Destinations: See Route network below
- Parent company: Pan American World Airways

Pan Am Express was a brand name for a code sharing passenger feed service operated by other airlines on behalf of Pan American World Airways (Pan Am). It was founded in the early 1980s, and lasted until the demise of Pan Am in 1991.

== History ==
In 1980, Pan American World Airways acquired National Airlines, thus obtaining a domestic route network in the U.S. for the first time in its history. In order to provide connecting passenger service to smaller destinations, the creation of a feeder network soon became necessary.

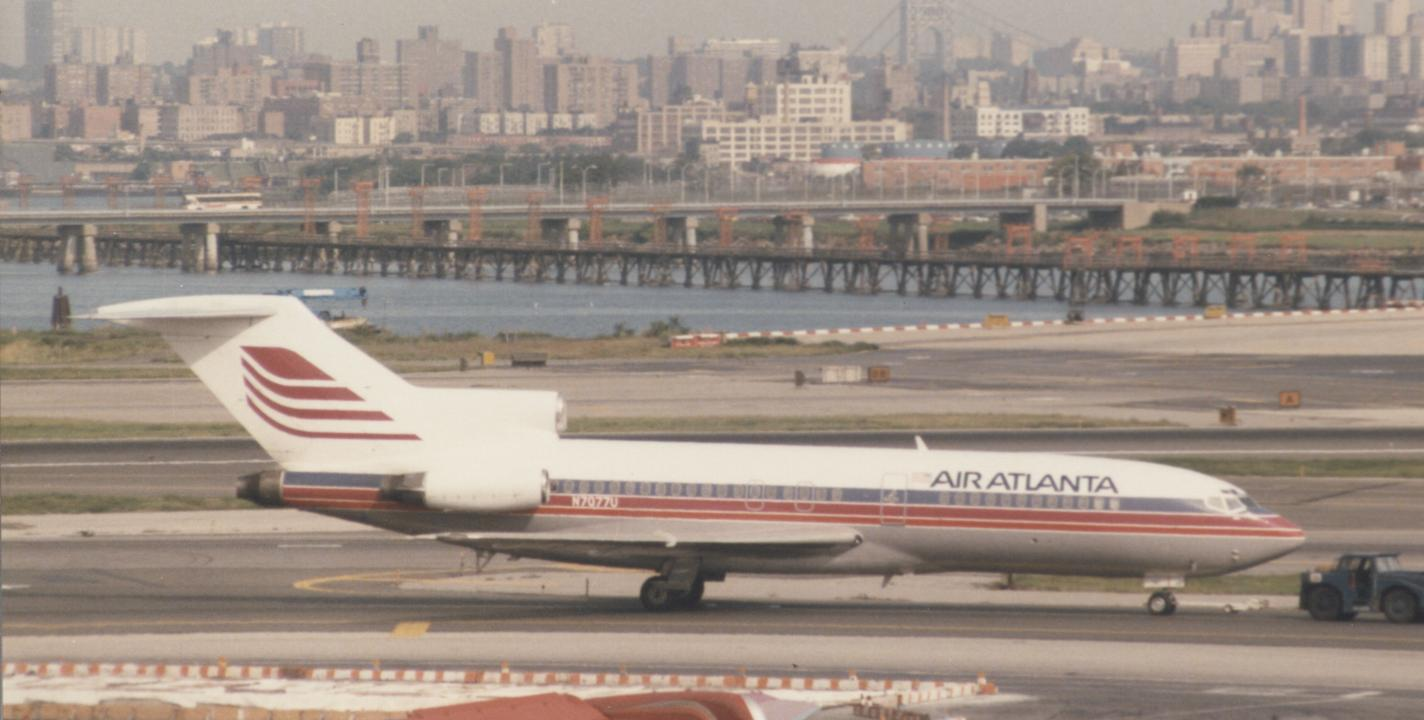
An Air Atlanta Boeing 727 at LaGuardia Airport (1985).

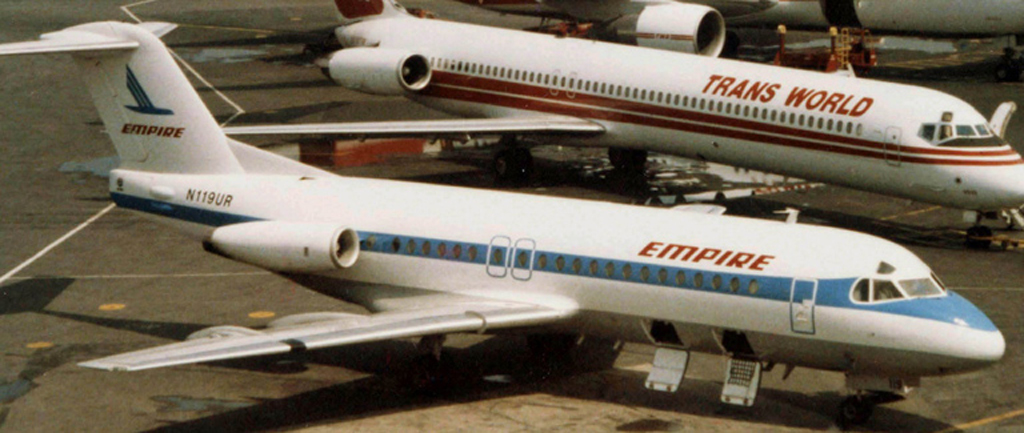
An Empire Airlines Fokker F28 Fellowship at LaGuardia Airport (1986).

For this task, a number of airlines flying narrow body jet equipment and/or turboprop aircraft were contracted via code sharing agreements:

- Air Atlanta (from 1984 to 1987)
- Emerald Air (from 1981 until 1985)
- Empire Airlines (until 1985)
- Pacific Express
- Presidential Airways (only during 1987)
- Republic Airlines (until 1986)

The focus of the Pan Am Express network was put on feeding into Pan Am's hub at John F. Kennedy International Airport (JFK). The northeastern U.S. was particularly well covered, but there were also feeder service flights operated in Arizona, California, Florida and Texas as well as the midwestern and southern U.S.

In 1987, Pan Am acquired Ransome Airlines, which was subsequently renamed Pan Am Express and began operating under the banner and aircraft livery of Pan Am. It fully concentrated on serving the JFK hub and also operated a second feeder network in Europe, offering regional flights out of Berlin Tegel Airport. Pan Am Express also operated flights between Los Angeles (LAX) and San Diego (SAN) which were not linked to any other smaller destinations in the regional network. When Pan Am declared bankruptcy in early 1991 and was forced to sell its New York hub to Delta Air Lines, Pan Am Express continued to operate the northeast regional system and the Miami system for Pan Am until the brand was shut down together with its parent on December 4, 1991. On that date, Ransome / Pan Am Express was sold to Trans World Airlines and began operating the same system for TWA from December 5, 1991 until November 1995 when TWA shut down this operation.

== Route network ==
Between 1983 and 1991, the Pan Am Express branding was used on flights to the following destinations in the United States, Canada and the Bahamas:

| Location | US State/ Country | Airport | Start | End | operated by |
|---|---|---|---|---|---|
| Little Rock | Arkansas | Clinton National Airport | 1985 | 1991 | Republic Airlines; Pan Am Express |
| Phoenix | Arizona | Phoenix Sky Harbor International Airport | 1985 | 1986 | Republic Airlines |
| Los Angeles | California | Los Angeles International Airport | 1989 | 1990 | Pan Am Express |
| San Diego | California | San Diego International Airport | 1985; 1989 | 1986; 1990 | Republic Airlines; Pan Am Express |
| Hartford County | Connecticut | Bradley International Airport | 1984; 1987 | 1985; 1991 | Empire Airlines; Pan Am Express |
| Daytona Beach | Florida | Daytona Beach International Airport | 1990 | 1991 | Pan Am Express |
| Fort Myers | Florida | Southwest Florida Regional Airport | 1990 | 1991 | Pan Am Express |
| Key West | Florida | Key West International Airport | 1990 | 1991 | Pan Am Express |
| Melbourne | Florida | Melbourne Orlando International Airport | 1990 | 1991 | Pan Am Express |
| Miami | Florida | Miami International Airport (hub) | 1984; 1990 | 1986; 1991 | Air Atlanta; Pan Am Express |
| Naples | Florida | Naples Municipal Airport | 1990 | 1991 | Pan Am Express |
| Sarasota | Florida | Sarasota–Bradenton International Airport | 1990 | 1991 | Pan Am Express |
| West Palm Beach | Florida | Palm Beach International Airport | 1990 | 1991 | Pan Am Express |
| Atlanta | Georgia | Hartsfield–Jackson Atlanta International Airport | 1984 | 1986 | Air Atlanta, Republic Airlines |
| Chicago | Illinois | O'Hare International Airport | 1985 | 1986 | Republic Airlines |
| Fort Wayne | Indiana | Fort Wayne International Airport | 1986 | 1986 | Republic Airlines |
| Indianapolis | Indiana | Indianapolis International Airport | 1985 | 1986 | Republic Airlines |
| South Bend | Indiana | South Bend Regional Airport | 1986 | 1986 | Republic Airlines |
| Baltimore | Maryland | Baltimore–Washington International Airport | 1987 | 1991 | Pan Am Express |
| Boston | Massachusetts | Logan International Airport | 1988 | 1990 | Pan Am Express |
| Detroit | Michigan | Detroit Metropolitan Airport (focus city) | 1985 | 1986 | Republic Airlines |
| Grand Rapids | Michigan | Kent County International Airport | 1985 | 1986 | Republic Airlines |
| Kalamazoo | Michigan | Kalamazoo County Airport | 1985 | 1986 | Republic Airlines |
| Minneapolis | Minnesota | Minneapolis–Saint Paul International Airport | 1985 | 1986 | Republic Airlines |
| Kansas City | Missouri | Kansas City International Airport | 1985 | 1986 | Republic Airlines |
| St. Louis | Missouri | St. Louis Lambert International Airport | 1985 | 1986 | Republic Airlines |
| Albany | New York | Albany International Airport | 1985 | 1990 | Emerald Airlines, Pan Am Express |
| Binghamton | New York | Edwin A. Link Field-Broome County Airport | 1985 | 1996 | Emerald Airlines |
| Buffalo | New York | Buffalo Niagara International Airport | 1983 | 1991 | Emerald Airlines, Empire Airlines, Pan Am Express |
| Elmira | New York | Elmira Corning Regional Airport | 1985 | 1996 | Emerald Airlines |
| Ithaca | New York | Ithaca Tompkins Regional Airport | 1983 | 1986 | Emerald Airlines, Empire Airlines |
| New York City | New York | John F. Kennedy International Airport (hub); LaGuardia Airport | 1983 | 1991 | Air Atlanta, Emerald Airlines, Empire Airlines, Pan Am Express, Republic Airlines |
| Rochester | New York | Greater Rochester International Airport | 1983 | 1991 | Emerald Airlines, Empire Airlines, Pan Am Express |
| Syracuse | New York | Syracuse Hancock International Airport | 1983 | 1991 | Emerald Airlines, Empire Airlines, Pan Am Express |
| Utica | New York | Oneida County Airport | 1983 | 1986 | Emerald Airlines, Empire Airlines |
| Akron | Ohio | Akron-Canton Airport | 1985 | 1986 | Republic Airlines |
| Cincinnati | Ohio | Cincinnati/Northern Kentucky International Airport | 1985 | 1986 | Republic Airlines |
| Columbus | Ohio | Port Columbus International Airport | 1985 | 1986 | Republic Airlines |
| Dayton | Ohio | Dayton International Airport | 1986 | 1986 | Republic Airlines |
| Erie | Pennsylvania | Erie International Airport | 1985 | 1986 | Republic Airlines |
| Philadelphia | Pennsylvania | Philadelphia International Airport | 1987 | 1991 | Republic Airlines, Pan Am Express |
| Pittsburgh | Pennsylvania | Pittsburgh International Airport | 1990 | 1991 | Pan Am Express |
| Providence | Rhode Island | T.F. Green Airport | 1984; 1987 | 1984; 1991 | Empire Airlines; Pan Am Express |
| Memphis | Tennessee | Memphis International Airport | 1984 | 1986 | Air Atlanta, Republic Airlines |
| Nashville | Tennessee | Nashville International Airport | 1985 | 1986 | Republic Airlines |
| Austin | Texas | Robert Mueller Municipal Airport | 1983 | 1983 | Emerald Airlines |
| Dallas | Texas | Dallas/Fort Worth International Airport | 1985 | 1986 | Republic Airlines |
| Houston | Texas | George Bush Intercontinental Airport | 1982; 1985 | 1983; 1986 | Emerald Airlines; Republic Airlines |
| McAllen | Texas | McAllen-Miller International Airport | 1982 | 1983 | Emerald Airlines |
| San Antonio | Texas | San Antonio International Airport | 1982 | 1983 | Emerald Airlines |
| Burlington | Vermont | Burlington International Airport | 1985 | 1986 | Emerald Airlines |
| Norfolk | Virginia | Norfolk International Airport | 1987 | 1991 | Presidential Airways, Pan Am Express |
| Seattle | Washington | Seattle–Tacoma International Airport | 1985 | 1986 | Republic Airlines |
| Greenbrier County | West Virginia | Greenbrier Valley Airport | 1981 | 1991 | Atlanta Airlines, Pan Am Express |
| Appleton | Wisconsin | Outagamie County Regional Airport | 1985 | 1986 | Republic Airlines |
| Green Bay | Wisconsin | Austin Straubel International Airport | 1985 | 1986 | Republic Airlines |
| Madison | Wisconsin | Madison Municipal Airport | 1985 | 1986 | Republic Airlines |
| Milwaukee | Wisconsin | General Mitchell International Airport | 1985 | 1986 | Republic Airlines |
| Washington, D.C. | | Washington Dulles International Airport | 1987 | 1987 | Presidential Airways |
| Freeport | Bahamas | Grand Bahama International Airport | 1990 | 1991 | Pan Am Express |
| Governor's Harbour | Bahamas | Governor's Harbour Airport | 1991 | 1991 | Pan Am Express |
| Marsh Harbour | Bahamas | Marsh Harbour Airport | 1991 | 1991 | Pan Am Express |
| Nassau | Bahamas | Lynden Pindling International Airport | 1991 | 1991 | Pan Am Express |
| North Eleuthera | Bahamas | North Eleuthera Airport | 1991 | 1991 | Pan Am Express |
| Rock Sound | Bahamas | Rock Sound International Airport | 1991 | 1991 | Pan Am Express |
| Treasure Cay | Bahamas | Treasure Cay Airport | 1991 | 1991 | Pan Am Express |
| Hamilton | Ontario, Canada | John C. Munro Hamilton International Airport | 1988 | 1988 | Pan Am Express |

In Europe, the following destinations were served:

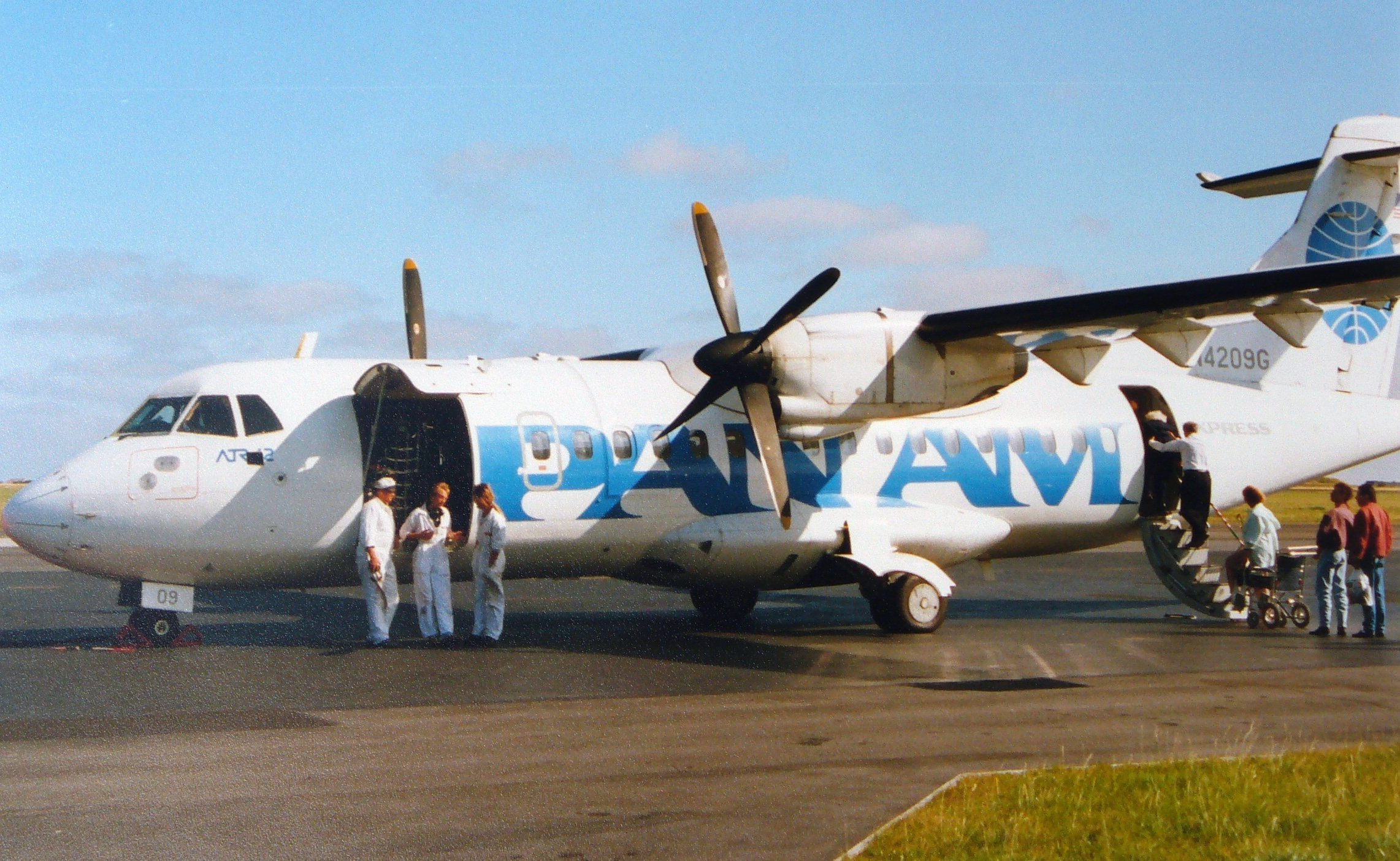
Boarding of a Pan Am Express ATR 42 at Sylt Airport (1991).

| Location | Country | Airport | Start | End |
|---|---|---|---|---|
| Innsbruck | Austria | Innsbruck Airport | 1988 | 1988 |
| Salzburg | Austria | Salzburg Airport | 1988 | 1988 |
| Vienna | Austria | Vienna International Airport | 1988 | 1988 |
| Copenhagen | Denmark | Copenhagen Airport | 1990 | 1991 |
| Strasbourg | France | Strasbourg International Airport | 1988 | 1989 |
| (West) Berlin | (West) Germany | Berlin Tegel Airport (hub) | 1988 | 1991 |
| Bremen | (West) Germany | Bremen Airport | 1989 | 1990 |
| Dortmund | (West) Germany | Dortmund Airport | 1988 | 1988 |
| Düsseldorf | (West) Germany | Düsseldorf Airport | 1988 | 1988 |
| Hamburg | (West) Germany | Hamburg Airport | 1991 | 1991 |
| Hanover | (West) Germany | Langenhagen Airport | 1988 | 1991 |
| Kiel | (West) Germany | Kiel Airport | 1988 | 1990 |
| Westerland | (West) Germany | Sylt Airport | 1989 | 1991 |
| Oslo | Norway | Fornebu Airport | 1990 | 1991 |
| Stockholm | Sweden | Stockholm Arlanda Airport | 1989 | 1989 |
| Basel | Switzerland | EuroAirport Basel-Mulhouse-Freiburg | 1988 | 1989 |

== Fleet ==
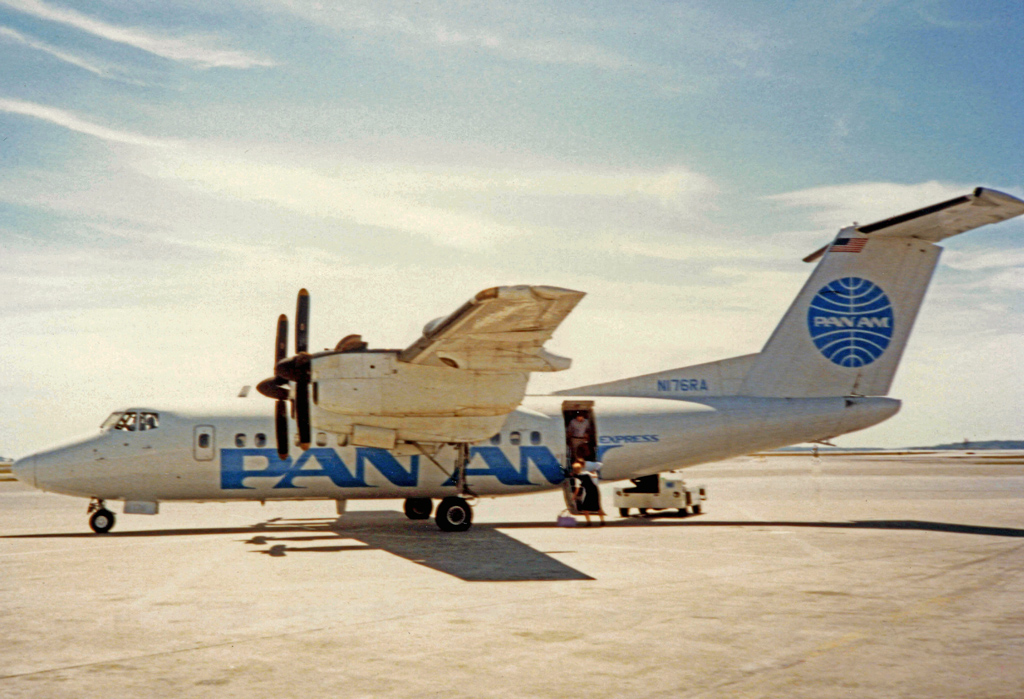
A Pan Am Express de Havilland Canada Dash 7 on arrival at Logan International Airport, completing a flight from John F. Kennedy International Airport (1987).

The following aircraft types were used on Pan Am Express flights:

| Aircraft | Airline |
|---|---|
| ATR 42 - turboprop | Pan Am Express |
| BAe 146-100 - whisper jet | Pan Am Express |
| Boeing 727 - jet | Air Atlanta, Republic Airlines |
| Convair CV-580 - turboprop | Republic Airlines |
| de Havilland Canada DHC-7 Dash 7 - turboprop | Pan Am Express |
| Fairchild Hiller FH-227 - turboprop | Emerald Airlines |
| Fokker F28 Fellowship - jet | Empire Airlines |
| McDonnell Douglas DC-9 - jet | Emerald Airlines, Republic Airlines |
| Jetstream 31 - turboprop | Pan Am Express |

== See also ==
- List of defunct airlines of the United States
