= Air Atlanta =

American airline (1984–1987)

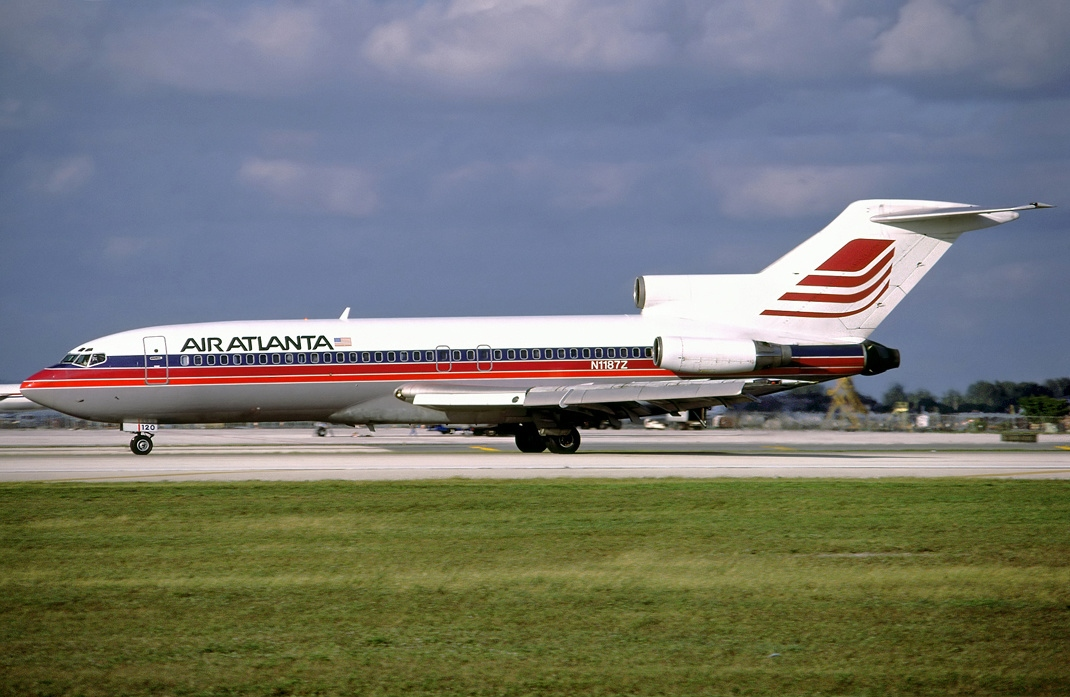
- An Air Atlanta Boeing 727-100 at Miami International Airport in 1987, this aircraft crashed in 2011 as Hewa Bora Airways Flight 952
IATA	ICAO	Call sign
CC	CRB	AIRLAN
- Founded: 1984; 42 years ago
- Ceased operations: 1987; 39 years ago
- Hubs: William B. Hartsfield Atlanta International Airport
- Headquarters: Atlanta, Georgia, U.S.

Air Atlanta was an airline based in Atlanta, Georgia, United States, during the mid-1980s, serving over a dozen cities from its hub located at the Hartsfield-Jackson Atlanta International Airport (ATL).

== History ==
The airline was started in February 1984, by attorneys Michael Hollis and Daniel Kolber. Besides operating point to point service as an independent air carrier, it also provided passenger feed for Pan American World Airways as "Air Atlanta Pan Am Express", connecting Pan Am passengers to and from flights operated by Air Atlanta.

Air Atlanta's first scheduled route was Atlanta-Memphis, with the first flight being operated on February 1, 1984, using a Boeing 727-100 jetliner. By April 1, 1984, nonstop 727 service was being operated Atlanta-Memphis, Atlanta-Miami and Atlanta-New York JFK Airport. By July 1, 1985, Atlanta-New York LaGuardia Airport nonstop service had been added as well. The airline subsequently introduced service to Detroit, Fort Myers, Greenbrier/Lewisburg, WV, New Orleans, Orlando, Philadelphia, Tampa, and Washington National Airport in Crystal City, Virginia, outside Washington, D.C.

When Air Atlanta initially began service, every seat was a first class seat with meals served on white linen accompanied by fine china and crystal although the airline stated that it was charging coach fares for this service. Air Atlanta then introduced two class service on its Boeing 727 aircraft with 2-2 seating in first class and 2-3 seating in coach with the latter cabin usually being configured with 3-3 seating by most other air carriers that operated the 727. The airline flew three million passengers before it shut down on April 2, 1987, when it filed bankruptcy. At the time it filed, KLM offered to invest $10 million in Air Atlanta if the existing investors would match it. The existing investors declined even though Air Atlanta was making progress. Air Atlanta had a perfect safety record and was responsible for many innovations in the airline industry including with respect to financing its operations through the use of the zero coupon convertible note.

== Fleet ==
The Air Atlanta fleet began with five Boeing 727-100 aircraft. Five Boeing 727-200s were added as time passed.

== Destinations ==
Air Atlanta operated scheduled passenger flights to the following destinations at various times during its existence:

- Georgia
  - Atlanta (William B. Hartsfield Atlanta International Airport) – primary hub
- Colorado
  - Gunnison (Gunnison-Crested Butte Regional Airport) - seasonal weekend service from Atlanta during the 1985 winter ski season
- Florida
  - Ft. Myers (Southwest Florida International Airport)
  - Miami (Miami International Airport)
  - Orlando (Orlando International Airport)
  - Tampa (Tampa International Airport)
- Louisiana
  - New Orleans (New Orleans International Airport)
- Michigan
  - Detroit (Detroit Metropolitan Wayne County Airport)
- New York
  - New York City (John F. Kennedy International Airport and LaGuardia Airport)
- Pennsylvania
  - Philadelphia (Philadelphia International Airport)
- Tennessee
  - Memphis (Memphis International Airport)
- Virginia
  - Crystal City—Washington, D.C., area (Washington National Airport)
- West Virginia
  - Lewisburg (Greenbrier Valley Airport)

The majority of the flights operated by Air Atlanta were operated to and from Atlanta (ATL) on a nonstop point to point basis. Several exceptions were nonstop service operated between New York JFK Airport and Lewisburg, West Virginia, via the Greenbrier Valley Airport (LWB), between New York JFK Airport and Philadelphia (PHL) as well as between Tampa (TPA) and Orlando (MCO) and also between Tampa and Fort Myers (RSW). In addition, Air Atlanta operated direct one stop service between a number of its destinations with most of these flights making an intermediate stop in Atlanta which also served as the airline's connecting hub.

== See also ==
- List of defunct airlines of the United States
