= Greenbrier Military School =

- Lewisburg, West Virginia; United States

Information
- Type: Private
- Motto: Truth, Duty, Honor
- Established: 1812; 214 years ago
- Status: Closed
- Closed: 1972; 54 years ago
- Gender: Boys
- Campus: Rural

The Greenbrier Military School was a boys-only, private, military, boarding high school and Junior College, located in Lewisburg, West Virginia. The school was founded in 1812 and closed in 1972, when the campus was converted into the West Virginia School of Osteopathic Medicine. The sister school was Greenbrier College.

== Present Day Impact ==
In the early 2000s, alumni of The Greenbrier Military School created a program called The Greenbrier Cadet Program where they partnered with Fork Union Military Academy. The program honors one cadet each year that exemplifies the values held by The Greenbrier Military School and the cadet wears an honor cord which is presented at the spring parades, where Greenbrier Military School alumni are the guests of honor.

The school's alumni fund a scholarship at the WVSOM osteopathic college that occupies the former military school plant and campus.

The Greenbrier Military School Alumni Association (GMSAA) directs and funds the Greenbrier Military School Leadership Scholarship, that grants scholarships to at least one graduating senior from both Greenbrier East High School and Greenbrier West High School.

== Notable alumni ==
- Sheriff Blake, Major League Baseball pitcher
- William H. "Bill" Compton, Jr., mental health advocate, Class of 1963
- Bob Evans, restaurateur, Class of 1937
- Homer A. Holt, 20th Governor of West Virginia
- Jim Justice, 36th Governor of West Virginia
- Alan Mollohan, former U.S. Representative for West Virginia's 1st congressional district
- Joe Palumbo, All-American football player at the University of Virginia
- José Armando Bermúdez Pippa (Don Poppy), former CEO of J. Armando Bermúdez & Co., S.A.
- Roger Price, humorist and creator of Droodles and Mad Libs
- Winston L. Shelton, engineer and inventor
- Don Panoz, businessman, auto racing patron and founder, Elan Pharmaceuticals
- Buzzy Wilkinson, former Boston Celtics guard, West Virginia Sports Hall of Fame
