= Bill Compton =

American mental health activist (1945–2007)

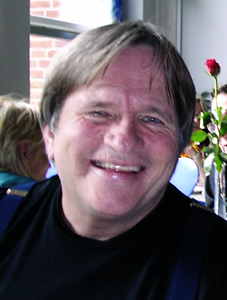
Bill Compton in Vejle, Denmark, July 2004 (Photo by Peter Lehmann)

William H. Compton, Jr. (October 6, 1945, Rockford, Illinois – August 27, 2007) was a mental health advocate in California who attained national stature. After a mental health crisis in 1989, he became heavily involved in self-help and patients' rights advocacy issues. Between 1994 and 2007 he was the head of a large network of peer support groups.

== Work in the mental health field ==
Beginning in 1994, Compton headed Project Return: The Next Step (PR:TNS), a consumer-run self-help network supported by the National Mental Health Association of Greater Los Angeles. In May 2007, the organization was renamed Project Return Peer Support Network. He became director of the network when the sponsoring organization decided to turn the network's administration over to those who used its services.

Compton built the network from about thirty peer-support groups to more than one hundred, which employed about one hundred individuals in positions ranging from stipend to full-time, serving several thousand individuals with serious mental disorders. The network included projects that Compton developed, such as PR:TNS Discovery Centers, which provided personal and professional growth opportunities, and the Friendship Line, an after-hours phone service that provided peer-to-peer support for people with mental illness.

Compton was on the Board of Directors of Mental Health America (formerly the National Mental Health Association) from 2002 to 2007. He was also president of the board of Protection & Advocacy, Inc. of California, which focused on protecting the rights of mental health and other disabled consumers throughout California. Beginning in November, 2003, Compton was the chairman of the board of directors for the Pacific Clinic, the largest nonprofit mental health organization in California, based in Pasadena, California; he left that position in 2005.

In 2005, Compton wrote a one-man play, "Swept Away or The Week That I Went Crazy." He performed it at a number of conferences and schools.

== Personal history ==
Compton was born in 1945 in Rockford, Illinois. He spent his teenage years at Greenbrier Military School in West Virginia; during the 1960s, he was a vocal anti-war activist. Compton earned a Bachelor of Arts degree in 1969 in Theater Arts from the University of Akron, and returned to earn a Master of Arts degree in 1986. During this time he worked as an actor, producer and director in New York City, Boston, and eventually Los Angeles. In Boston, in the 1970s, he ran a then-innovative business for theater-goers to purchase tickets by phone, using a credit card. He sold the business, Quickcharge, to a predecessor of Ticketmaster.

In 1989, in his mid-40s and an event salesperson for a large Los Angeles theater, Compton had a complete mental breakdown; his family believes it may have been caused by his use of crystal methamphetamine. When he was diagnosed as having late-onset schizophrenia, he had already left his job and had no health insurance. After three admissions to a private hospital over a nine-month period, paid for by his family, he was transferred to a public hospital. Upon his discharge from there, Compton went to live in a community board and care home. He began hearing voices again, ending up living on the streets for nine months, panhandling for money to buy food. In the early 1990s, he made his way to a hospital waiting room, his first step on the road to recovery.

== Presentations and testimony ==
In 2001, while president of the California Network of Mental Health Clients, a statewide alliance of consumers, Compton testified before the state legislature's Joint Commission on Mental Health Reform.

Compton made presentations at state and national conferences on topics such as establishing and enhancing a network of self-help clubs, running a peer support telephone help line and incorporating the role of consumer-run services into a mental health system.

He regularly made presentations to graduate students at the University of Southern California School of Social Work and Division of Occupational Science and Occupational Therapy, as well as psychology students at the University of California Los Angeles.

== Awards and recognition ==
- In June 2001, the National Mental Health Association (NMHA) presented the Clifford W. Beers Award to Compton at its annual conference in Washington, D.C.
- In June 2002, Compton received the Consumer Advocacy Award from the International Association of Psychosocial Rehabilitative Agencies.
- In November 2003, Eli Lilly and Company gave Compton its "Helping Move Lives Forward Reintegration Award" for his mentorship of people with mental illness.
- In 2004, Compton was included in Who's Who in America.
- In 2007, Compton received a proclamation from the Los Angeles County Board of Supervisors for bringing Project Return Peer Support Network members "into a full participation in community life."
