= Supreme Court Library Building =

- U.S. National Register of Historic Places
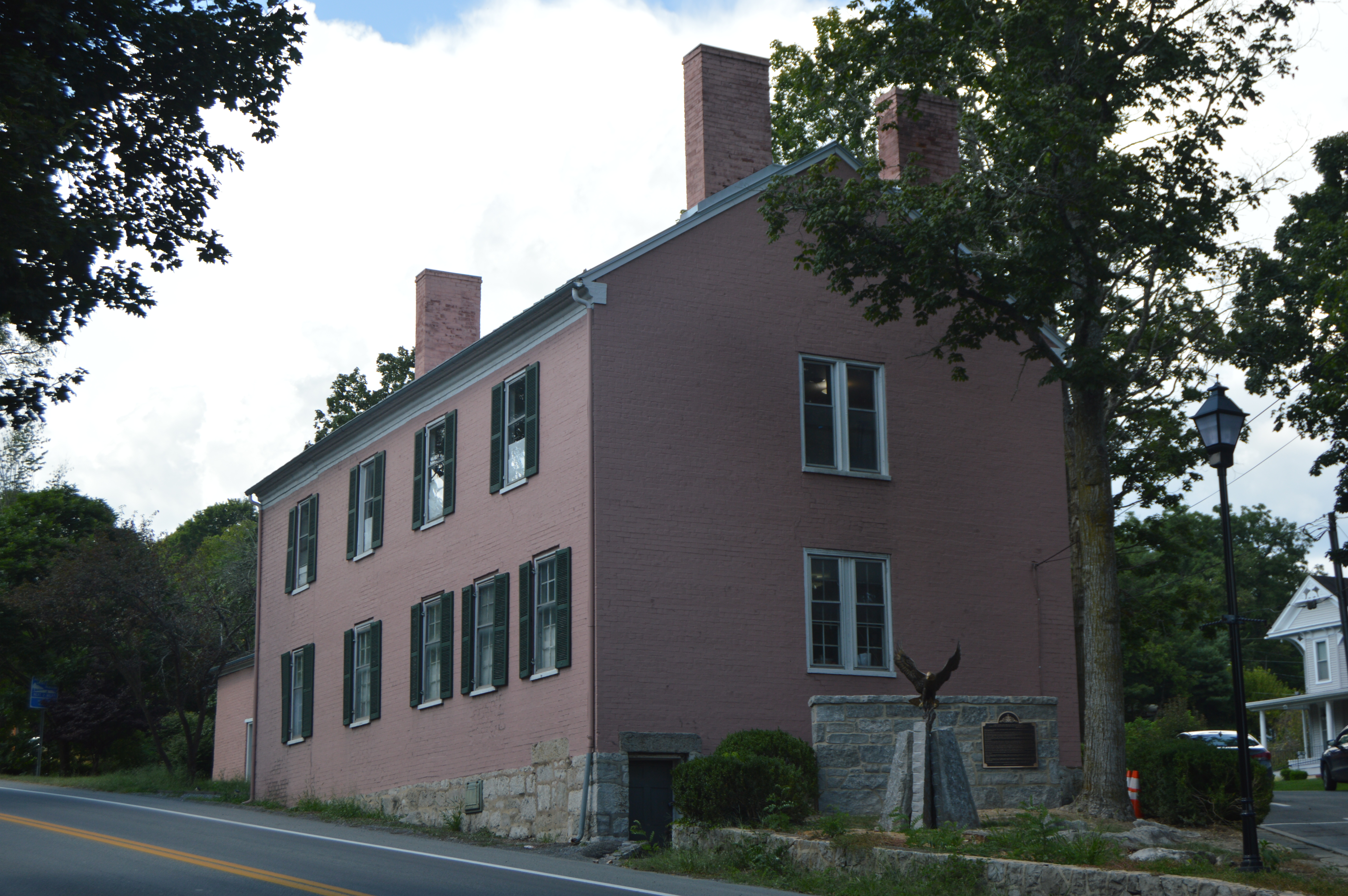
- Front and southeastern end

- Location within West Virginia Location within the United States
- Location: U.S. Route 60W and Courtney Dr., Lewisburg, West Virginia
- Coordinates: 37°48′12″N 80°26′53″W
- Area: 0.5 acres (0.20 ha)
- Built: 1834; 192 years ago
- NRHP reference No.: 72001287
- Added to NRHP: February 23, 1972

Supreme Court Library Building, now known as Greenbrier County Library and Museum, is a historic library building located at Lewisburg, Greenbrier County, West Virginia. It was built in 1834, and is a two-story building built of locally fired brick. It was constructed to serve as a law library and study for the Virginia Supreme Court of Appeals. This was leased to the State of Virginia until the court sessions ended in 1864. During the American Civil War, it served as a military hospital. Inside the building, there is graffiti left by recovering soldiers. It was then occupied as a Masonic lodge until acquired by the Greenbrier College. In 1935, the college deeded it to the town for use by the Greenbrier County Library and Museum. Currently, the building is used as a library by the New River Community and Technical College.

It was listed on the National Register of Historic Places in 1972.
