= No Hace Falta =

Single by Cristian

from the album Amar Es
- Released: August 4, 2003
- Recorded: 2003
- Studio: Crescent Moon Studios (Miami, Florida, U.S.A.)
- Genre: Latin pop; j-pop; latin ballad
- Length: 4:47
- Label: BMG U.S. Latin
- Songwriters: Emilio Estefan Jr.; Nicolás Tovar; Randall M. Barlow
- Producers: Emilio Estefan, Jr.

Cristian singles chronology
| "Cuando Me Miras Así" (2002) | "No Hace Falta" (2003) | "Te Llamé" (2003) |

Music video
- "No Hace Falta" on YouTube

"No Hace Falta" (English: There's No Need) is a ballad performed by Mexican singer-songwriter Cristian Castro, taken from his eighth studio album Amar Es (2003). The song was released as the lead single from the album on August 4, 2003, by BMG U.S. Latin. The song was written and produced by Emilio Estefan, Jr., co-wrriten by Nicolás Tovar and Randall M. Barlow.

== Chart performance ==
=== Weekly charts ===
| Chart (2003) | Peak position |
|---|---|
| U.S. Billboard Hot Latin Tracks | 6 |
| U.S. Billboard Latin Pop Airplay | 5 |
| U.S. Billboard Latin Tropical Airplay | 21 |

=== Year-end charts ===
| Chart (2003) | Peak position |
|---|---|
| U.S. Billboard Latin Pop Airplay | 37 |

== Music video ==
A music video, directed by Emilio Estefan, Jr. was shot in 2003. Set in a washitsu, Cristian's then wife Gabriela Bo appeared in the video as a Geisha. The video was included in the album Amar Es and was also included in Nunca Voy a Olvidarte...Los Exitos DVD.
