= West Virginia School of Osteopathic Medicine =

Osteopathic medical school in West Virginia

- Type: Public medical school
- Established: 1974; 52 years ago
- Budget: $35.64 million
- President: James W. Nemitz
- Dean: Gail Swarm
- Faculty: 57
- Students: 778
- Location: Lewisburg, West Virginia, United States; 37.8058°N 80.4373°W
- Campus: Rural
- Website: www.wvsom.edu

The West Virginia School of Osteopathic Medicine (WVSOM) is a public medical school in Lewisburg, West Virginia. Founded in 1974, WVSOM is one of three medical schools in West Virginia and the sole institution that grants the Doctor of Osteopathic Medicine (D.O.) degree. WVSOM currently has 778 students, and focuses on primary care and rural medicine.

== History ==
Purchasing a facility once used as Greenbrier Military School (1812–1972), the Greenbrier College of Osteopathic Medicine began as a private school with a class of 36 students in 1974. Two years later, in 1976, the board of governors of the school donated it to the state, which accepted establishing it as a state-funded public institution now named the West Virginia School of Osteopathic Medicine. In 1978, WVSOM graduated its first class of 33 students. Extensive renovations started in 1992 and continue into the present time, with construction just completed on a new 19,000-square-foot (1,800 m^{2}) building that includes exam rooms and laboratory space. WVSOM has spent more than $38 million on construction and renovation projects while increasing from one building in 1974 to 12 campus facilities across its more than 50-acre (200,000 m^{2}) campus, all of this was accomplished while maintaining a debt free financial status.

On August 15, 2016, State Senator Craig Blair proposed privatizing the institution. Blair stated that the institution was diverting money from other functions and could thrive as a private institution freed from state bureaucratic regulations.

== Academics ==
WVSOM was founded on the principles of osteopathic medicine, a branch of medicine founded by frontiersman Andrew Taylor Still in the mid-to-late 19th century. The basic premise of osteopathic medicine is that a physician's primary role is to facilitate the body's inherent ability to heal itself. While originally designed as an improvement on the traditional medicine of 19th century America, osteopathic medicine became a reformation within the U.S. healthcare system while remaining distinct from other forms of medicine.

In addition to a medical education, students at WVSOM also learn holistic techniques and are trained in Osteopathic Manipulative Medicine (OMM), manual-based therapies used to relieve pain, restore range of motion and foster the body's own ability to heal itself. Medical school at WVSOM is a four-year program, with two years of training located at the Lewisburg-based campus and the final two years taking place off-campus during clinical rotations.

== Demographics ==
WVSOM's current enrollment stands at 778 students, with out-of-state students composing the majority (557 out of state :221 in state). The median age is 27, and there are students from 46 states currently attending WVSOM. The male female ratio is roughly equal with 384 females and 408 males. WVSOM maintains a diverse ethnic community on campus, with 161 minority students. AACOMAS reports that 5,298 students applied for admission into WVSOM's most recent class (Class of 2020).

== Notable alumni ==
- Kelli Ward, Arizona politician
- Tom Takubo, West Virginia politician
