= Carnegie Hall, Inc. =

Cultural center in Lewisburg, West Virginia, US

Coordinates: 37°48′06.2″N 80°26′55.9″W

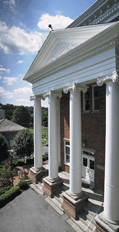
Carnegie Hall, Inc.

Carnegie Hall, Inc. is a regional cultural center located in Lewisburg, West Virginia, United States. It is within the Allegheny Mountains. Monroe, Greenbrier, Pocahontas and Summers Counties are included in Carnegie Hall, Inc.’s primary service area. This region encompasses approximately 2,900 square miles (7,500 km^{2}) and 73,000 people.

Carnegie Hall, Inc. annually serves more than 75,000 patrons with live performances by artists from around the world, arts in education programming, classes, workshops, fine art exhibits, and more. Carnegie Hall, Inc. is one of only eight Carnegie Halls still in continuous use as a performance venue.

== Mission statement ==
Carnegie Hall, Inc.’s slogan is "Bringing the Arts to Life!". The organization adopted its current mission statement in 2017: "Carnegie Hall, Inc. is committed to cultivating an appreciation for creativity and excellence in the arts. In partnership with the community, Carnegie Hall presents a broad and diverse range of programs that engage, entertain, and educate people of all ages and backgrounds and works to preserve the historic significance of the Hall."

== History ==
Originally known as the Lewisburg Academy, the school was founded around 1812 by Presbyterian pastor Dr. John McElhenny as a co-educational institution. For unclear reasons, the Lewisburg Academy separated into two schools, the Greenbrier Military School and the Lewisburg Female Institute, in the 1870s. The Lewisburg Female Institute (LFI) was a girls’ boarding school, and students could attend from grades 1-12. The focus of LFI changed in 1937; women could only attend for four years, two years of high school and two years of college. There was always a heavy emphasis on the arts, with the majority of students enrolled in at least music class in the early 20th century. Throughout its history, girls could take courses in a variety of subjects including math, English, history, science, Bible, music, home economics, and secretarial work. On December 16, 1901, a fire destroyed the original buildings of the LFI. Classes were held at City Hall and The Greenbrier for the remainder of the year.

Present day Carnegie Hall

In the search for funding, the Rev. Dr. R. L. Telford, who was president of the Institute from 1892-1911, wrote to Mr. James Bertram, private secretary to Andrew Carnegie. Known for his philanthropic efforts, Carnegie initially donated $20,000 for the new building then contributed another $6,750 for the completion of the auditorium. Carnegie asked the local community to contribute $10,000. The total cost of construction would be a little over $1 million in today's dollars.

The Lewisburg Female Institute, also known as the Lewisburg Seminary and College of Music, Lewisburg Seminary, Greenbrier College for Women, and finally Greenbrier College, used Carnegie Hall as classroom space until 1972. The building housed a science lab, music rehearsal spaces, an auditorium with a pipe organ, and social spaces. During the 1940s and 1950s, Carnegie Hall was used for Community Concerts, free concerts for Greenbrier College students and the community, featuring a diverse array of performing artists, mostly musicians. Greenbrier College allowed men to attend for a year from 1971-1972. Only four male students lived on campus, and co-ed classes were only offered at the high school level.

Due to low enrollment and financial reasons, Greenbrier College closed its doors in May 1972. After the closure, Carnegie Hall became part of the Greenbrier Center, a facility for individuals with special needs. Rumors in the Lewisburg community swirled in the early 1980s that the building was going to be condemned and torn down. Realizing the historical significance of the building, several residents of Lewisburg founded Carnegie Hall, Inc in 1983. Initially, the public was offered free performances in the historic building in an effort to renew a sense of interest in culture and history in the region. The first official performance season began in 1990.

The building was damaged by a fire on Christmas Eve 1996, and Carnegie Hall, Inc. undertook a massive renovation to restore the building—a project that took nearly a year to complete.

=== Architecture and renovations ===
Carnegie Hall, Inc.’s original structure was designed by architects Barrett & Thompson in 1902 in the Georgian Revival style, characterized foremost by its Ionic order portico with pediment, shouldered architrave trim, tall first floor windows and cornice with dentils. Keeping with this style, the remainder of the structure is composed of simple, rectangular blocks with flat roofs.

A major renovation was designed by architects TAG Galyean and Kreps & Kreps (now Kreps & Zachwieja) and completed on June 18, 1997 to accommodate an elevator, administrative offices and an accessible entrance to the building.

In 2006, renovations to the front entrance were completed to comply with ADA guidelines, including a ramp, floor leveling and parking.

=== Notable performances ===
Today, artists from all over the world perform in Carnegie Hall's Hamilton Auditorium. Notable performers include:

- Mose Allison
- Asleep at the Wheel
- Mary Chapin Carpenter
- Arlo Guthrie
- Richie Havens
- Ladysmith Black Mambazo
- Taj Mahal
- Wynton Marsalis
- Kathy Mattea
- Josh Ritter
- Ricky Skaggs
- Isaac Stern
- The Seldom Scene
- Vienna Boys' Choir
- Doc Watson
- Gillian Welch
- Chatham County Line

== Present Day ==
As a 501(c)(3) Carnegie Hall, Inc. also provides year-round arts education and programming for youth and adults in Southern West Virginia. Besides their Mainstage Series and Ivy Terrace Concert Series, Carnegie Hall hosts a variety of arts educational programming. Carnegie Hall hosts two fundraising events per year: Taste of Our Towns (TOOT), a street food festival hosted annually on the second Saturday in October; and the Carnegie Hall Gala, held since 2017 at The Greenbrier in White Sulphur Springs. Carnegie Hall has three gallery spaces and is the permanent home of the West Virginia Music Hall of Fame. Visitors can explore the building alone or take a guided tour.

== Other buildings named Carnegie Hall ==
Seven other Halls are currently in use around the world as performance venues, as was their original intent. There is:

- Carnegie Hall, a 540-seat venue in Andrew Carnegie's native birthplace Dunfermline.
- 1928-seat Carnegie Music Hall (the second biggest Carnegie Hall) in Carnegie's adopted hometown of Pittsburgh, Pennsylvania. It is on the site of the Carnegie Museums of Pittsburgh and the main branch of the Carnegie Library of Pittsburgh.
- Carnegie Hall on the North Side of Pittsburgh, formerly known as Allegheny, Pennsylvania, attached to the Carnegie Library. The first Carnegie Music Hall to open in the USA.
- Carnegie Music Hall attached to the Carnegie library in the Pittsburgh suburb of Braddock, Pennsylvania. This was built as part of an 1893 addition to the Braddock Carnegie Library.
- 1,022-seat Carnegie Music Hall in Pittsburgh suburb of Homestead, Pennsylvania. Site houses the Carnegie Library of Homestead, which contains a music hall, library, gymnasium, and indoor swimming pool where Olympic athletes have practiced.
- Carnegie Music Hall attached to the Carnegie library in the Pittsburgh suburb of Carnegie, Pennsylvania.
- Carnegie also built a Library and Music Hall in the Pittsburgh suburb of Duquesne, Pennsylvania that was demolished in 1968.
- The most commonly known Carnegie Hall stands in New York City.

== See also ==
- List of concert halls
