= Greenbrier Valley Airport =

- IATA: LWB; ICAO: KLWB; FAA LID: LWB

Summary
- Airport type: Public
- Owner: Greenbrier County Airport Authority
- Serves: Lewisburg, West Virginia
- Location: Greenbrier County, West Virginia, near Lewisburg and White Sulphur Springs
- Elevation AMSL: 2,302 ft (702 m)
- Coordinates: 37°51′30″N 080°23′58″W
- Website: www.mylwb.com

Map
- Location within West Virginia Location within the United States

Runways
Direction	Length		Surface
Direction	ft	m	Surface
4/22	7,003	2,135	Asphalt

Statistics (2019)
- Aircraft operations: 7,765
- Based aircraft: 18
- Source: Federal Aviation Administration

Greenbrier Valley Airport (IATA: LWB, ICAO: KLWB, FAA LID: LWB) is three miles north of Lewisburg in Greenbrier County, West Virginia. SkyWest Airlines, on behalf of American Eagle, schedules airline flights subsidized by the Essential Air Service program to Charlotte Douglas International Airport and Chicago O'Hare International Airport. Federal Aviation Administration records say the airport had 10,902 passenger boardings (enplanements) in calendar year 2021 and 10,048 in 2022. The National Plan of Integrated Airport Systems for 2023–2027 called it a primary commercial service airport based on enplanements in 2021.

== History ==
The airport opened in 1968–69 with a 6000-foot runway; the 1975 Official Airline Guide shows Piedmont Airlines (1948-1989) Fairchild Hiller FH-227s and NAMC YS-11s nonstop from Charleston, WV, Huntington, WV, and Roanoke, VA. In 1979 Piedmont had Boeing 727-100 and Boeing 737-200 nonstops from Atlanta and from LaGuardia Airport in New York City, while continuing NAMC YS-11 nonstops from Roanoke. In 1983 Piedmont scheduled three daily nonstop Boeing 737-200s to Roanoke, continuing to Atlanta, New York LaGuardia Airport or Tri-Cities Regional Airport. Piedmont ended jet flights to the airport and by 1985 had turned its Greenbrier service over to its commuter affiliate Piedmont Regional which flew de Havilland Canada DHC-7 Dash 7s nonstop from Baltimore and Roanoke. Jet service returned in 1986, Air Atlanta Boeing 727-100 nonstops to Atlanta and New York JFK Airport. In 1989 USAir Express was the only airline, with de Havilland Canada DHC-8 Dash 8 nonstops from Charlotte and Washington Reagan National Airport and Fairchild Metroliner nonstops from Pittsburgh, all operated for Piedmont successor USAir. By 1996 USAir Boeing 737-200s flew nonstop from New York LaGuardia Airport while its commuter affiliate USAir Express was flying nonstop from Charlotte with Short 360s. In 1999 USAir Express successor US Airways Express was the only airline at Greenbrier, with two nonstop BAe Jetstream 31s a day from Charlotte.

== Facilities ==
Greenbrier Valley Airport covers 472 acres (191 ha) at an elevation of 2,302 feet (702 m). Its one runway, 4/22, is 7,003 by 150 feet (2,135 x 46 m) asphalt.

In the year ending December 31, 2019, the airport had 7,765 aircraft operations, average 21 per day: 56% general aviation, 25% air taxi, 18% airline, and 2% military. 18 aircraft were then based at this airport: 15 single-engine, 2 multi-engine, and 1 jet.

The airport has four rental car companies, namely Avis, Hertz, Enterprise, and National.

== Airlines and destinations ==
=== Passenger ===
Airlines	Destinations	Refs.
American Eagle	Charlotte, Chicago–O'Hare	

== Statistics ==
Busiest domestic routes from Greenbrier Valley Airport (LWB) (August 2025 – July 2026)
Rank	City	Passengers
1	Charlotte, North Carolina	7,100
2	Chicago–O'Hare, Illinois	3,090

== See also ==
- List of airports in West Virginia

== Other sources ==
- Essential Air Service documents (Docket OST-2003-15553) from the U.S. Department of Transportation:
  - Notice of Air Midwest (June 30, 2003): to terminate scheduled air service at Greenbrier/White Sulphur Springs, West Virginia.
  - Order 2004-2-13 (February 19, 2004): selecting Air Midwest, Inc., d/b/a US Airways Express, to provide essential air service at Greenbrier/White Sulphur Springs/Lewisburg, West Virginia, for a two-year period at an annual subsidy rate of $40,579; and, sets final rates for Air Midwest hold-in service at the community, which ends with the beginning of the two-year rate team.
  - Order 2006-4-8 (April 11, 2006): selecting Air Midwest, Inc., d/b/a US Airways Express, to provide year-round essential air service at Greenbrier/White Sulphur Springs/Lewisburg, West Virginia, for the two-year period beginning June 1, 2006, at an annual subsidy rate of $685,040.
  - Order 2007-7-21 (July 31, 2007): selecting Gulfstream International Airlines, Inc. to provide subsidized essential air service (EAS) at DuBois and Franklin/Oil City, Pennsylvania, Greenbrier/White Sulphur Springs/Lewisburg, West Virginia, and Athens, Georgia, at a total annual subsidy rate of $4,077,792 ($1,159,229 for DuBois, $763,741 for Franklin/Oil City, $1,329,477 for Greenbrier/White Sulphur Springs/Lewisburg, and $825,345 for Athens) for the two-year period beginning when Gulfstream inaugurates service through the end of the 24th month thereafter.
  - Order 2008-5-3 (May 6, 2008): selecting Gulfstream International Airlines, Inc. to provide subsidized essential air service (EAS) at DuBois and Franklin/Oil City, Pennsylvania, and Greenbrier/White Sulphur Springs/Lewisburg (Lewisburg), West Virginia, at a total annual subsidy rate of $5,577,594 ($2,020,095 for DuBois, $1,226,773 for Franklin/Oil City, and $2,330,725 for Lewisburg) for the two-year period beginning when Gulfstream inaugurates service through the end of the 24th month thereafter.
  - Letter of Air Midwest LLC (May 14, 2008): advising that it has decided to discontinue all air carrier operations, liquidate its assets and surrender its FAA and DOT certificates. Air Midwest is also providing its service terminations schedules (May 23: Athens, Dubois, Franklin/Oil City, Greenbrier/White Sulphur Springs/Lewisburg; May 31: Ely, Visalia, Merced, Kingman, Prescott; June 30: Colombia, El Dorado, Harrison, Hot Springs, Jonesboro, Grand Island, Kirksville, Joplin, McCook).
  - Order 2010-5-22 (May 19, 2010): requesting proposals from carriers interested in providing essential air service (EAS) at Bradford, DuBois, and Oil City/Franklin, Pennsylvania, and Jamestown, New York, for the next two-year period from October 1, 2010, through September 30, 2012, with or without subsidy. Not soliciting proposals for Greenbrier/White Sulphur Springs, West Virginia (In Order 2008-5-3, May 6, 2008, Greenbrier was included under the same contract as DuBois and Oil City/Franklin. However, on June 10, 2010, Atlantic Southeast Airlines and Pinnacle Airlines, both operating as Delta Connection, will inaugurate subsidy-free service from Greenbrier Valley Airport to both Atlanta-Hartsfield Jackson International Airport and New York LaGuardia Airport with 50-seat Canadair CRJ-200 aircraft. Delta Connection will provide one daily nonstop round trip in the Greenbrier-Atlanta market and one daily nonstop round trip in the Greenbrier-New York LaGuardia market.
  - Ninety Day Notice of Atlantic Southeast Airlines, Inc. (December 16, 2011): of termination of service at Greenbrier/White Sulphur Springs, WV.
  - Ninety Day Notice of Pinnacle Airlines, Inc. (December 16, 2011): of termination of service at Greenbrier/White Sulphur Springs, WV.
  - Order 2012-5-17 (May 22, 2012): selecting Silver Airways, formerly Gulfstream International Airways, to provide Essential Air Service (EAS) at Muscle Shoals, Alabama, Greenville, Laurel/Hattiesburg, and Tupelo, Mississippi, and Greenbrier/White Sulphur Springs, West Virginia (Lewisburg), using 34-passenger Saab 340 aircraft, for a combined annual subsidy of $16,098,538.
  - Order 2012-6-5 (June 7, 2012): extending the Essential Air Service (EAS) obligation of Delta Air Lines, Inc., at Greenbrier/White Sulphur Springs, West Virginia, for an additional 30 days, through July 13, 2012.
