= Greenbrier College =

Women's college in Lewisburg, West Virginia (1812–1972)

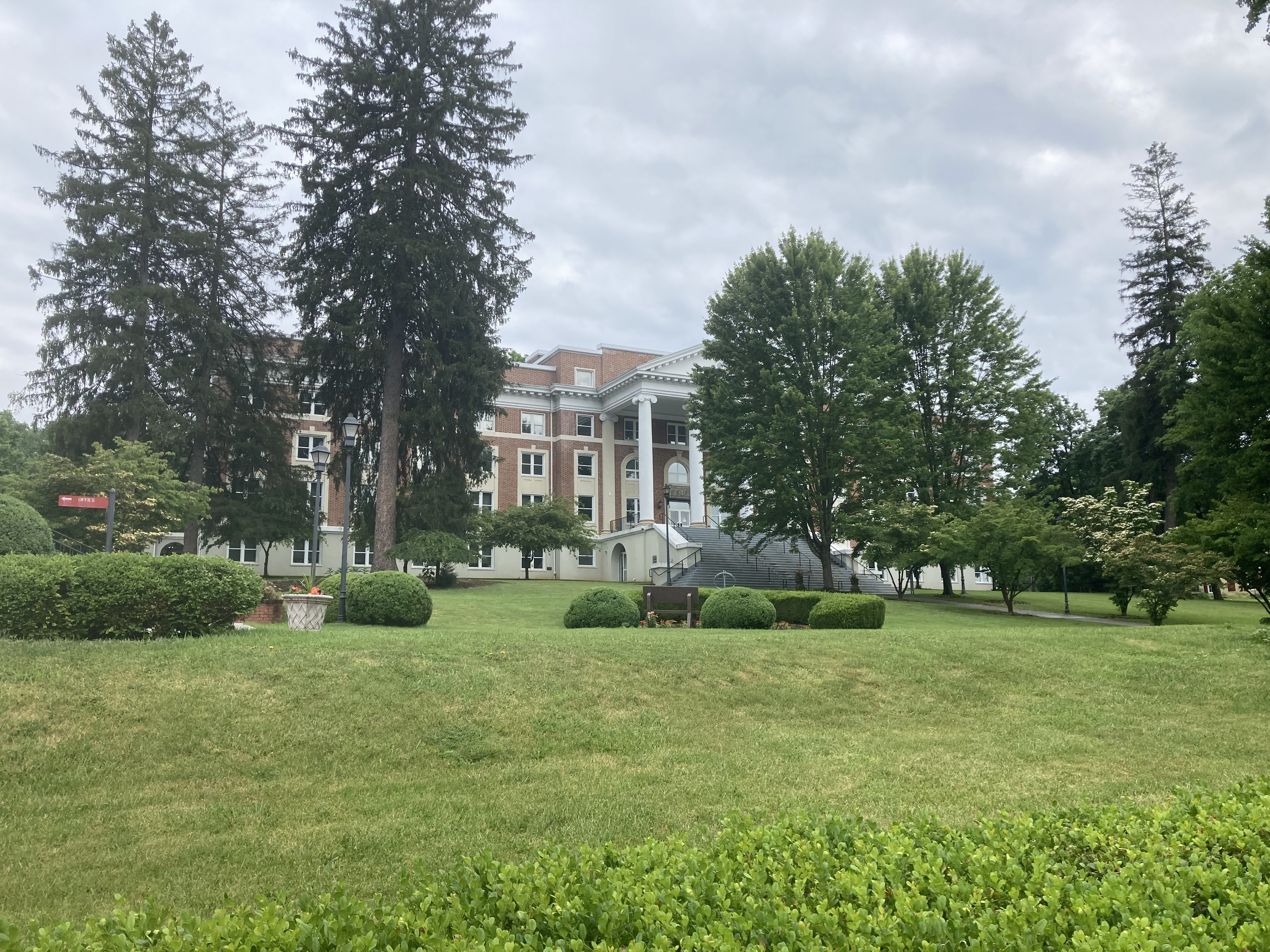
A view of the former Greenbrier College from Church Street in Lewisburg, West Virginia.

Greenbrier College was a women's college in Lewisburg, West Virginia in the United States from 1812 to 1972. It started as Lewisburg Academy and when the school closed during the American Civil War, it reopened in 1875 it split into two schools: the Greenbrier College for Women and the Greenbrier Military School. The Greenbrier College also went by the Lewisburg Female Institute and Lewisburg Female Seminary.

== History ==
Greenbrier College started as the Lewisburg Academy. Lewisburg Academy was established by Reverend John McElhenney in 1812 as the first school in Greenbrier County, West Virginia. The school closed during the American Civil War. When the school, reopened in 1875 it split into two schools: the Greenbrier College for Women and the Greenbrier Military School.

Much of the school burned down in 1901. It was rebuilt in 1902. The school again burned in 1921. The school shut down in 1972 and sold it to the West Virginia State Department of Mental Health and became the Greenbrier Center.

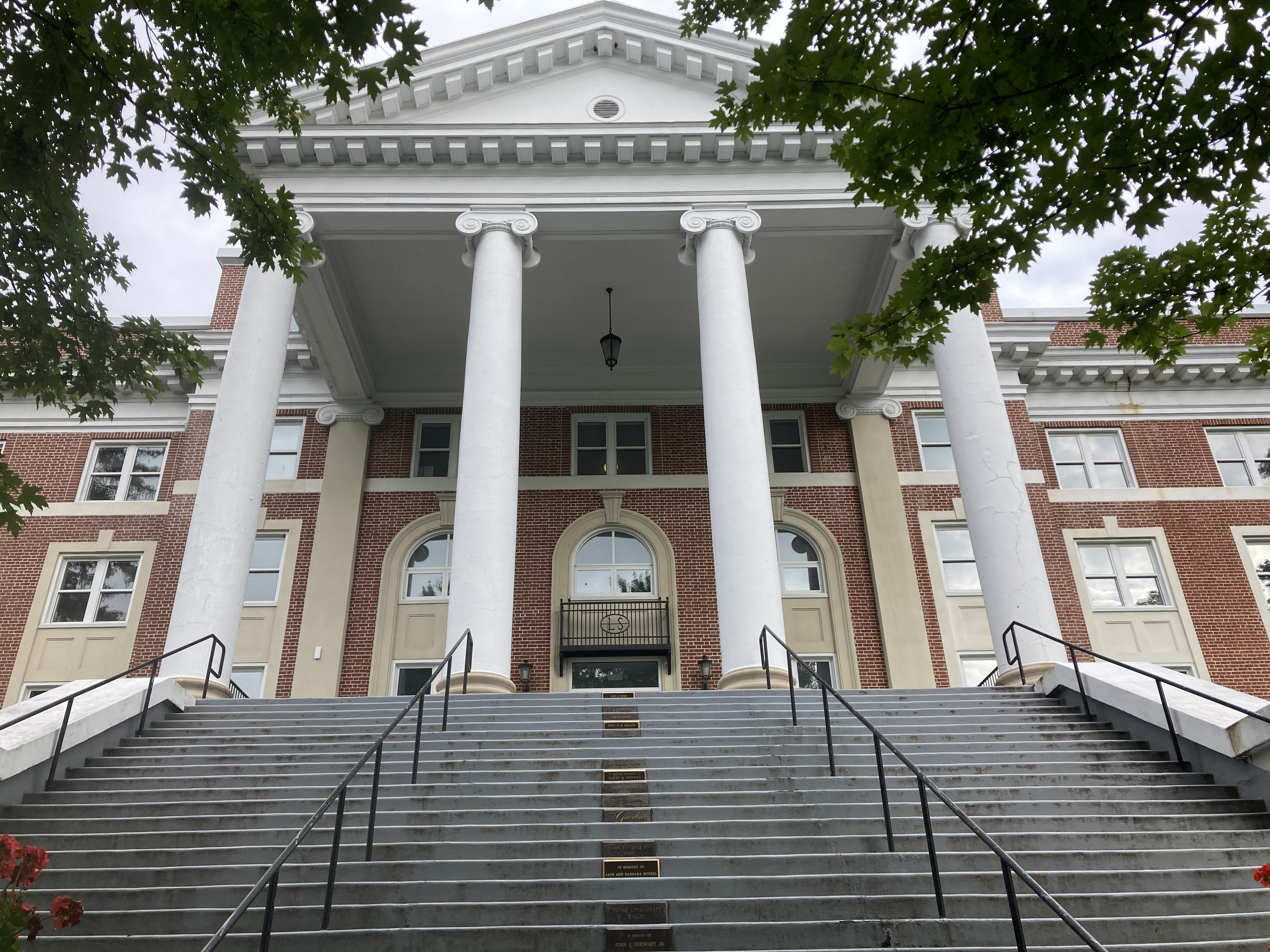
A close up of the main building of the former Greenbrier College

== Campus ==
Carnegie Hall was built as the music hall and department for the women's college with support from Andrew Carnegie.

The North House museum was given to the Greenbrier Historical Society forming the Greenbrier Historical Society. Carnegie Hall, Inc. was formed in 1983 to save the building from destruction and continues to serve the community. The main school buildings eventually became the New River Community and Technical College.

== Student life ==
The college included a chapter of Sigma Iota Chi and Zeta Mu Epsilon sororities.

== Notable people ==
=== List of known presidents ===
- John McElhenney (1812-)
- Dr. Matthew Lyle Lacy (1882-)
- Reverend John C. Brown (-1892)
- Rev. Robert L. Telford (1892–1911)
- Robert C. Sommerville (1911–1916)
- Robert H. Adams (1916–1919)
- Dora T. M. Biggs (1919–1920)
- John I. Armstrong (1920–1924)
- J. Marian Moore (1924–1925)
- French W. Thompson (1925–1952)
- Ralph Murray (1952–1954)
- John F. Montgomery (1954–1973)

Telford, Armstrong, Thompson, and Murray all lived in the John A. North House when they served as presidents. Many notable people, including Helen F. Holt, taught at the school.
