= Lewisburg, West Virginia =

City in West Virginia, US

- City
- Aerial view of downtown (2026)
- Interactive map of Lewisburg, West Virginia
- Location within West Virginia Location within the United States
- Coordinates: 37°48′06″N 80°26′44″W
- Country: United States
- State: West Virginia
- County: Greenbrier
- Established: 1782
- Named for: Andrew Lewis

Government
  - Mayor: Beverly White
  - City Recorder: Shannon Patrick-Beatty
  - Director of Public Works: Roger Pence

Area
  - Total: 3.81 sq mi (9.87 km^{2})
  - Land: 3.80 sq mi (9.85 km^{2})
  - Water: 0.0077 sq mi (0.02 km^{2})
- Elevation: 2,080 ft (630 m)

Population (2020)
  - Total: 3,922
  - Estimate (2021): 3,868
  - Density: 1,001.0/sq mi (386.48/km^{2})
- Time zone: UTC-5 (Eastern (EST))
  - Summer (DST): UTC-4 (EDT)
- ZIP code: 24901
- Area code: 304
- FIPS code: 54-46636
- GNIS feature ID: 1541811
- Website: www.lewisburg-wv.org

Lewisburg is a city in and the county seat of Greenbrier County, West Virginia, United States. The population was 3,930 at the 2020 census.

== History ==
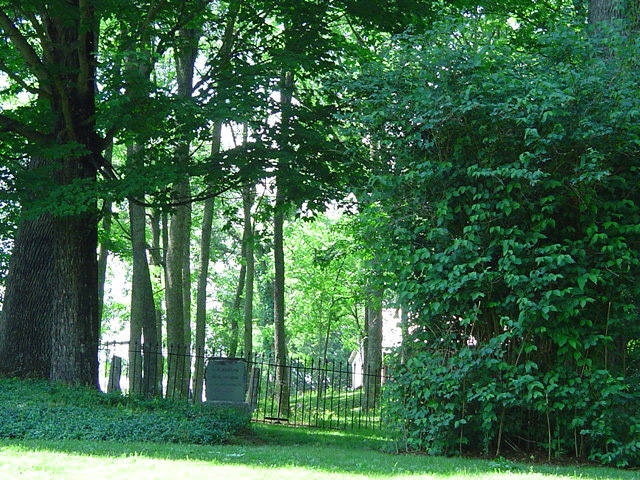
Civil War cemetery, Lewisburg

Lewisburg is named after Andrew Lewis. In 1751 Lewis, as a young surveyor, established a camp near the spring behind the present courthouse. This spring has been known as the Lewis Spring since that time. During Pontiac's Rebellion in 1763, Native Americans completely destroyed two of the early European settlements in Greenbrier County, killing the men and carrying off the women and children. This raid virtually eliminated all of the earliest settlers in the county. The Native Americans were primarily Shawnees, and (according to undocumented tradition) were led by the famous leader Hokoleskwa, or Cornstalk.

By 1770 a fortified encampment called Fort Savannah was established at the Lewis Spring. In 1774, Governor Dunmore of Virginia instructed then-Colonel Andrew Lewis to gather "willing and able men" to go to the great Kanawha River and stand against the Native American forces that were attacking the Greenbrier Valley. In what became known as Lord Dunmore's War, over 1,490 men were assembled, some at Fort Pitt at present-day Pittsburgh, and others at Fort Union, on the site of present-day Lewisburg. These recruits included Lewis's brother Charles, and others which history books refer to as one of the most remarkable assemblages of frontier leaders in American history. Thirteen were men of political and military distinction. Lewis's army marched down the New and Kanawha Rivers to the Ohio River, where they intended to cross over and invade the Ohio Country, which was the home of the Shawnees. The Native Americans, led by Cornstalk, attempted to cut them off at the mouth of the Kanawha, where they fought an inconclusive battle that came to be known as the Battle of Point Pleasant.

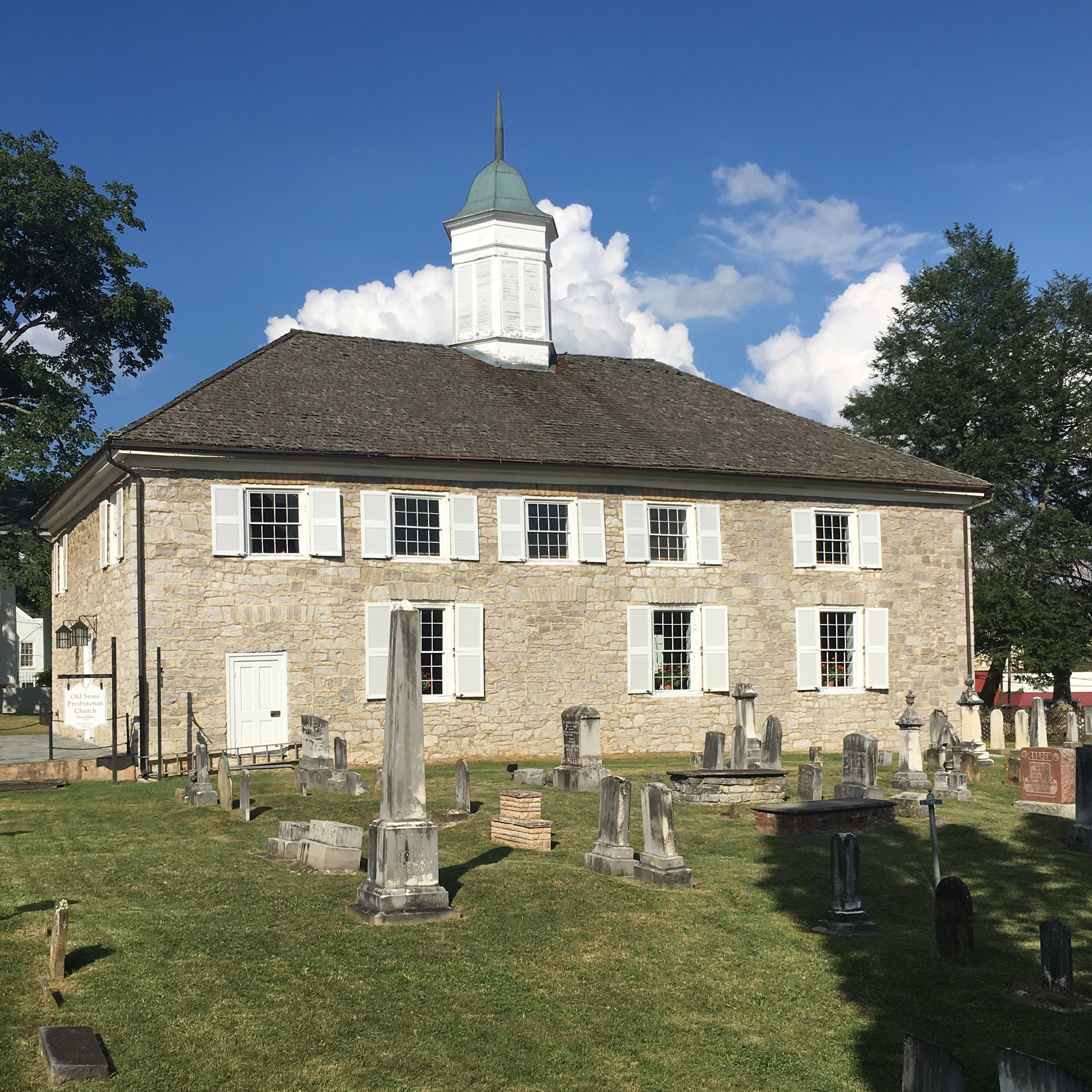
Old Stone Presbyterian Church

Map of Lewisburg in 1825

When the town of Lewisburg was formally laid out in 1780, Matthew Arbuckle, Sr. was the first settler. Among Lewisburg's first trustees was Col. John Stuart (1749–1823), a Revolutionary War commander who surveyed and settled the area and is known locally as the “Father of Greenbrier County”. The land on which the first county courthouse, and the Old Stone Church in Lewisburg, are situated was donated by Stuart. Lewisburg was formally established in 1782 by an act of the Virginia General Assembly. The original trustees were Samuel Lewis, James Reid, Samuel Brown, Andrew Donnelly, John Stuart, and Archer Mathews. To accommodate Virginians west of the mountains, several Virginia courts sat in Lewisburg, where Patrick Henry once successfully defended a client accused of murder. The town and the surrounding farms prospered and a number of spas and resort hotels were established at some of the outlying mineral springs.

During the Civil War a number of engagements were fought in and around Lewisburg, including the 1862 Battle of Lewisburg. Several of the present buildings in town were used as hospitals and barracks by both sides in this conflict, and bullet marks can still be seen in some today. The Virginia Supreme Court library, which was located in Lewisburg and served as the Greenbrier County Library until 2008, was used as a hospital and has preserved a section of wall with soldiers' graffiti.

In the mid 20th century, the Lewisburg area was home to several children's summer camps. Camp Ann Bailey, (named after Revolutionary War scout Anne Bailey) was located on the Greenbrier River. This Girl Scout camp was integrated in the 1950s thanks to the efforts of Charleston civil rights activist Elizabeth Harden Gilmore. The camp operated between 1927 and 1974, when it was closed to permit construction of Interstate 64. A boys' camp, Camp Shaw-Mi-Del-Eca, founded in 1929, was also located on the river. The two camps held joint activities, such as dances, with another nearby girls' camp, Camp Alleghany.

In 1978, a 236-acre (0.96 km^{2}) area in the heart of Lewisburg was designated a National Register Historic District.

Today, Lewisburg is home to the West Virginia School of Osteopathic Medicine, one of 29 osteopathic medical schools in the United States and one of three medical schools in West Virginia.

== Geography ==
Lewisburg is located approximately one mile north of the Greenbrier River.

According to the United States Census Bureau, the city has a total area of 3.81 square miles (9.87 km^{2}), of which 3.80 square miles (9.84 km^{2}) is land and 0.01 square miles (0.03 km^{2}) is water. Much of it is within the karst belt and a sinkhole is gated over at an intersection. It is part of the Davis Spring subwatershed.

Lewisburg is part of the Southern West Virginia region.

=== Climate ===
The climate in this area is characterized by hot, humid summers and generally cold winters. According to the Köppen Climate Classification system, Lewisburg has a humid continental climate, abbreviated "Dfb" on climate maps.

Climate data for Lewisburg 3N, West Virginia (37°51′24″N 80°24′15″W, 2,300 ft or 701 m AMSL), 1991–2020 normals, extremes 1900–present
Month	Jan	Feb	Mar	Apr	May	Jun	Jul	Aug	Sep	Oct	Nov	Dec	Year
Record high °F (°C)	75 (24)	77 (25)	86 (30)	91 (33)	92 (33)	99 (37)	102 (39)	97 (36)	97 (36)	94 (34)	80 (27)	75 (24)	102 (39)
Mean maximum °F (°C)	61.5 (16.4)	64.3 (17.9)	73.0 (22.8)	81.6 (27.6)	85.5 (29.7)	88.4 (31.3)	90.0 (32.2)	88.9 (31.6)	86.3 (30.2)	79.5 (26.4)	71.2 (21.8)	62.1 (16.7)	91.0 (32.8)
Mean daily maximum °F (°C)	38.7 (3.7)	42.9 (6.1)	51.7 (10.9)	63.8 (17.7)	72.0 (22.2)	78.9 (26.1)	82.4 (28.0)	81.1 (27.3)	75.5 (24.2)	64.7 (18.2)	52.7 (11.5)	42.3 (5.7)	62.2 (16.8)
Daily mean °F (°C)	29.3 (−1.5)	32.3 (0.2)	39.9 (4.4)	50.7 (10.4)	59.8 (15.4)	67.3 (19.6)	71.0 (21.7)	69.6 (20.9)	63.3 (17.4)	51.9 (11.1)	40.7 (4.8)	32.9 (0.5)	50.7 (10.4)
Mean daily minimum °F (°C)	19.9 (−6.7)	21.7 (−5.7)	28.0 (−2.2)	37.5 (3.1)	47.5 (8.6)	55.7 (13.2)	59.6 (15.3)	58.1 (14.5)	51.1 (10.6)	39.2 (4.0)	28.8 (−1.8)	23.6 (−4.7)	39.2 (4.0)
Mean minimum °F (°C)	−0.1 (−17.8)	3.6 (−15.8)	10.8 (−11.8)	22.0 (−5.6)	31.3 (−0.4)	41.9 (5.5)	49.1 (9.5)	47.7 (8.7)	36.0 (2.2)	23.5 (−4.7)	14.3 (−9.8)	5.8 (−14.6)	−3.5 (−19.7)
Record low °F (°C)	−20 (−29)	−10 (−23)	−7 (−22)	7 (−14)	22 (−6)	30 (−1)	35 (2)	35 (2)	24 (−4)	10 (−12)	−1 (−18)	−37 (−38)	−37 (−38)
Average precipitation inches (mm)	3.15 (80)	2.87 (73)	3.71 (94)	3.85 (98)	4.48 (114)	4.06 (103)	3.84 (98)	3.43 (87)	3.49 (89)	2.59 (66)	2.51 (64)	3.48 (88)	41.46 (1,053)
Average snowfall inches (cm)	8.4 (21)	8.7 (22)	5.4 (14)	0.6 (1.5)	0.0 (0.0)	0.0 (0.0)	0.0 (0.0)	0.0 (0.0)	0.0 (0.0)	0.3 (0.76)	0.7 (1.8)	5.4 (14)	29.5 (75)
Average precipitation days (≥ 0.01 in)	13.8	11.8	13.2	13.0	14.3	13.5	12.9	11.8	9.4	9.9	9.8	12.8	146.2
Average snowy days (≥ 0.1 in)	4.1	3.5	2.1	0.3	0.0	0.0	0.0	0.0	0.0	0.1	0.5	2.8	13.4
Source: NOAA

== Demographics ==
Historical population
Census	Pop.	Note	%±
1860	969		—
1870	875		−9.7%
1880	985		12.6%
1890	1,016		3.1%
1900	872		−14.2%
1910	803		−7.9%
1920	1,202		49.7%
1930	1,293		7.6%
1940	1,466		13.4%
1950	2,192		49.5%
1960	2,259		3.1%
1970	2,407		6.6%
1980	3,065		27.3%
1990	3,598		17.4%
2000	3,624		0.7%
2010	3,830		5.7%
2020	3,922		2.4%
2021 (est.)	3,868		−1.4%
U.S. Decennial Census

=== 2020 census ===
As of the 2020 census, Lewisburg had a population of 3,922. The median age was 47.4 years. 16.2% of residents were under the age of 18 and 29.1% of residents were 65 years of age or older. For every 100 females there were 84.3 males, and for every 100 females age 18 and over there were 80.8 males age 18 and over.

99.7% of residents lived in urban areas, while 0.3% lived in rural areas.

There were 1,919 households in Lewisburg, of which 19.9% had children under the age of 18 living in them. Of all households, 36.4% were married-couple households, 19.9% were households with a male householder and no spouse or partner present, and 38.5% were households with a female householder and no spouse or partner present. About 42.7% of all households were made up of individuals and 20.7% had someone living alone who was 65 years of age or older.

There were 2,187 housing units, of which 12.3% were vacant. The homeowner vacancy rate was 3.6% and the rental vacancy rate was 10.8%.

Racial composition as of the 2020 census
Race	Number	Percent
White	3,425	87.3%
Black or African American	192	4.9%
American Indian and Alaska Native	7	0.2%
Asian	78	2.0%
Native Hawaiian and Other Pacific Islander	0	0.0%
Some other race	48	1.2%
Two or more races	172	4.4%
Hispanic or Latino (of any race)	97	2.5%

=== 2010 census ===
As of the census of 2010, there were 3,830 people, 1,892 households, and 989 families living in the city. The population density was 1,007.9 inhabitants per square mile (389.2/km^{2}). There were 2,100 housing units at an average density of 552.6 per square mile (213.4/km^{2}). The racial makeup of the city was 90.5% White, 5.4% African American, 0.3% Native American, 1.9% Asian, 0.1% Pacific Islander, 0.4% from other races, and 1.4% from two or more races. Hispanic or Latino people of any race were 1.6% of the population.

There were 1,892 households, of which 20.2% had children under the age of 18 living with them, 41.3% were married couples living together, 8.2% had a female householder with no husband present, 2.7% had a male householder with no wife present, and 47.7% were non-families. 40.9% of all households were made up of individuals, and 18.8% had someone living alone who was 65 years of age or older. The average household size was 2.01 and the average family size was 2.73.

The median age in the city was 46.1 years. 17.7% of residents were under the age of 18; 8.5% were between the ages of 18 and 24; 22.5% were from 25 to 44; 27.3% were from 45 to 64; and 24.1% were 65 years of age or older. The gender makeup of the city was 46.6% male and 53.4% female.

=== 2000 census ===
As of the census of 2000, there were 3,624 people, 1,746 households, and 1,000 families living in the city. The population density was 951.0 people per square mile (367.3/km^{2}). There were 1,929 housing units at an average density of 506.2 per square mile (195.5/km^{2}). The racial makeup of the city was 90.73% White, 6.68% African American, 0.44% Native American, 0.52% Asian, 0.36% from other races, and 1.27% from two or more races. Hispanic or Latino people of any race were 0.66% of the population.

There were 1,746 households, out of which 20.5% had children under the age of 18 living with them, 46.6% were married couples living together, 8.6% had a female householder with no husband present, and 42.7% were non-families. 38.5% of all households were made up of individuals, and 19.4% had someone living alone who was 65 years of age or older. The average household size was 2.04 and the average family size was 2.69.

In the city, the population was spread out, with 17.8% under the age of 18, 6.8% from 18 to 24, 22.8% from 25 to 44, 28.3% from 45 to 64, and 24.2% who were 65 years of age or older. The median age was 47 years. For every 100 females, there were 79.1 males. For every 100 females age 18 and over, there were 74.3 males.

The median income for a household in the city was $27,857, and the median income for a family was $42,940. Males had a median income of $38,056 versus $21,386 for females. The per capita income for the city was $22,139, About 12.4% of families and 19.6% of the population were below the poverty line, including 21.2% of those under age 18 and 16.6% of those age 65 or over.

== Arts and culture ==
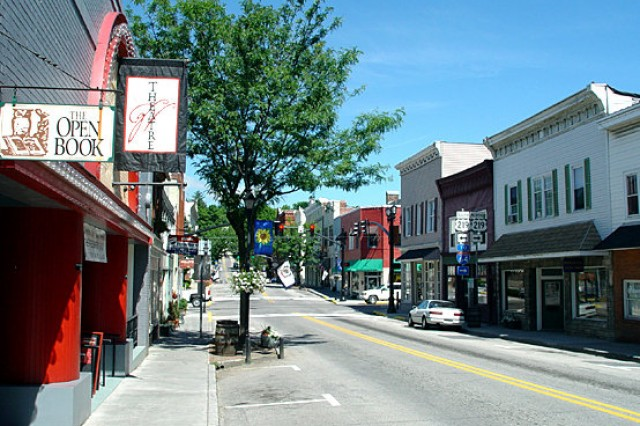
Downtown Lewisburg in Greenbrier County

Carnegie Hall in Lewisburg, one of only four Carnegie Halls still in continuous use

In 1902, steel baron and philanthropist Andrew Carnegie built Carnegie Hall as a classroom building for the Lewisburg Female Institute, later the Greenbrier College. Carnegie Hall, Inc. was incorporated in 1983 as a regional not-for-profit arts and education center. Today, the cultural center annually serves more than 75,000 patrons with live performances by artists from around the world, arts in education programming, classes, workshops, fine art exhibits, an independent film series and more. Carnegie Hall, Inc. is one of only four Carnegie Halls still in continuous use in the world.

The Greenbrier Historical Society and North House Museum is dedicated to collecting, preserving, and interpreting the rich history of the Greenbrier Valley. The Greenbrier Historical Society has operated within the North House since 1976 and has owned the building since 1992. Built in 1820, the North House was the home of local lawyer John North and his wife Charlotte for more than a decade before becoming James Frazier's Star Tavern and Inn. At the turn of the 20th century, the North House became the President's home for Greenbrier Women's College. Today, the museum's permanent displays and temporary exhibits feature items from across the Greenbrier Valley, including, but not limit to; the training saddle of General Robert E. Lee's horse Traveller, an 18th-century covered wagon, Civil War artifacts, furniture made by local craftsman David Surbaugh, as well as original items from the North family. The Greenbrier Historical Society archives and museum hold artifacts from before the revolutionary war through today.

The Greenbrier Historical Society and North House Museum also offers educational program, a research archive, group tour rates, and membership opportunities.

The Lewisburg post office holds a mural, Old Time Camp Meeting, painted by American artist Robert F. Gates as part of President Franklin Roosevelt's New Deal. The mural depicts a religious camp meeting, thought to be based on a local camp ground called Brushy Ridge.

The Lost World Caverns are nearby, and feature self-guided tours and numerous rock formations. Organ Cave is also in the area.

The State Fair of West Virginia is held in nearby Fairlea every August.

Lewisburg is the site of West Virginia's largest Martin Luther King Jr. Day celebration. The event includes a march through downtown Lewisburg, a community lunch, and a program commemorating the memory and legacy of Dr. King.

Belsnickle or Old Christmas is celebrated with the Shanghai Parade on New Year's Day. In this observation of the older traditions, people dress in costumes and march down the main street. Its term comes from "collie-shanghai", an old word related to making a lot of noise. The parade has been going on for over 150 years.

Other annual celebrations include two food festivals, Taste of Our Towns (TOOT) in October and the Chocolate Festival in April, and the Lewisburg Literary Festival, a celebration of books and the written word, held in August. Speakers at the Literary Festival have included Homer Hickam, author of Rocket Boys; Jeanette Walls, author of The Glass Castle; Garth Stein, author of The Art of Racing in the Rain; NBA basketball legend Jerry West; NPR's Noah Adams; West Virginia Poet Laureate and children's author Marc Harshman; and children's author Tom Angleberger of the Origami Yoda series.

In 2013, musicians in the community created the West Virginia Winter Music Festival, as a fundraiser for musicians in need of financial support due to a life emergency. It has grown to be an anticipated event in the area every January.

The Greenbrier Classic Concert series are held in nearby Fairlea at the State Fair Grounds every July. Artists who have performed include West Virginia native Brad Paisley, Carrie Underwood, Keith Urban, Reba McEntire. Miranda Lambert, Rod Stewart, Lionel Richie, Victoria Justice, Jon Bon Jovi, Kenny Chesney, Aerosmith, Maroon 5 and Jimmy Buffett.

== Parks and recreation ==
Lewisburg is a qualified Tree City USA as recognized by the National Arbor Day Foundation.

== Transportation ==
Historic Lewisburg is centered at the crossroads of U.S. Route 60, historically called The Midland Trail, and U.S. Route 219. Interstate 64's intersection with U.S. Route 219 near the northern border of the town has drawn most modern development into that area.

Greenbrier Valley Airport supports a general aviation community, and also has direct daily flights on SkyWest Airlines to Charlotte, North Carolina and Chicago, Illinois.

== Media ==
Lewisburg has two local newspapers, the daily West Virginia Daily News and the weekly Mountain Messenger.

== Folklore ==
In 1991, the American supermarket tabloid the Weekly World News published an article about the "Bat Boy", described as a large-eyed, fanged human child who, according to the article, had fallen in Lost World Caverns as a 10-year-old in the 1950s and escaped 30 years later in 1992. "Bat Boy" is described as a hybrid of human and subterranean life.

In 1997, "Bat Boy" became the subject of an off-Broadway horror rock musical, Bat Boy: The Musical. It was written by Keith Farley and Brian Flemmings, with music and lyrics by Laurence O'Keefe.

== Popular culture ==
- Lewisburg is a location in the game Fallout 76.

== Notable people ==
- Cleve Benedict, former congressman, West Virginia commissioner of Agriculture and US undersecretary of Energy
- Pinckney Benedict, novelist, writer of short stories, and son of Cleve Benedict
- Vernell "Bimbo" Coles, basketball Olympian and former player for the Miami Heat
- Phillip Hamman, soldier and scout known as "the Savior of the Greenbrier"
- Brad Hoylman, New York state senator
- Jim Justice, U.S. senator from West Virginia since 2025, governor of West Virginia 2017–2025
- Robert Bruce King, circuit judge on the United States Court of Appeals for the Fourth Circuit
- Stuart Margolin, actor and director, best known for his work on The Rockford Files
- Gary W. Martini, Marine awarded the Medal of Honor for service in the Vietnam War, local bridge named in his honor
- Henry M. Mathews, former governor of West Virginia, member of the Mathews family
- Johnny Olson, announcer, best known for his work on What's My Line?, Match Game, and The Price Is Right
- Mason Patrick, United States Army general and air power advocate
- John Stuart, pioneer and soldier, the "father of Greenbrier County"
