= Greenbrier River Watershed Association =

Nonprofit organization in West Virginia, U.S.

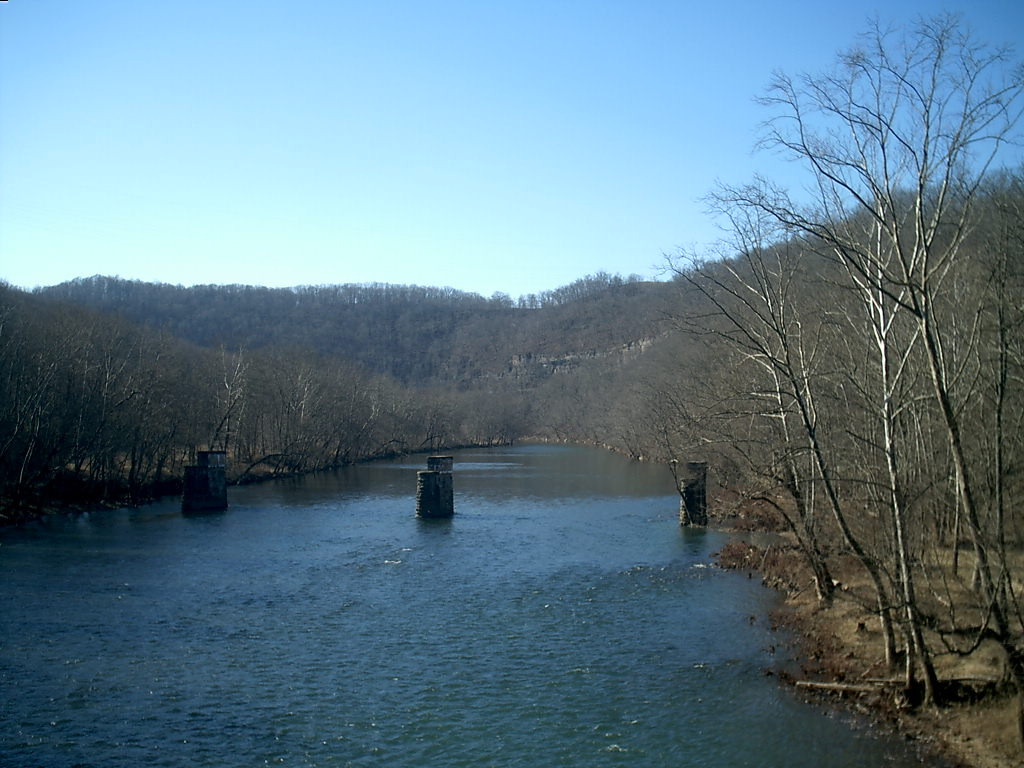
C&O Railway pillars of the Second Creek Tunnel along the Greenbrier River

The Greenbrier River Watershed Association (GRWA) is one of the oldest watershed associations in the state of West Virginia, founded in 1990. It has supported the creation of other watershed associations throughout the state and maintains a policy of "upstream courtesy" and "downstream courtesy" with its neighbors.

== Projects ==
The GRWA is a 501(c)(3) nonprofit that partners with other environmental nonprofits, government organizations, and like-minded groups to promote the values of the watershed in the hopes that the public will understand its unique riparian resources and thus recognize its worth. The Board of the GRWA is composed of cavers, farmers, developers, teachers, and other diverse individuals that unite in their love for the Greenbrier. They work with schools and civic groups to teach classes, organize field trips, and support similar organizations that protect the watershed.

== Outreach ==
Unlike the majority of the watersheds in West Virginia, the GRWA's webpage is centered around the watershed itself, not the organization. It survives on grants and public support (primarily membership donations), to assist the public with issues such as nonpoint source pollution, water quality, water quantity, protection of forests to alleviate pollution, prevention of substandard and/or illegal developments, injection wells, using sinkholes and cave systems for trash disposal, leaking septic tanks, water sampling, straightpipes, and wastewater treatment plant issues. The Clean Water Act of 1972 has enabled the GRWA to help citizens seek legal, effective methods of improving their waters for the benefit of public health.

Riffles is the GRWA newsletter, published on a quarterly basis. Submissions from members are strongly encouraged and nearly a third of its members are out of state. Riffles are the shallow, oxygen-rich rapids of a river, which is as full of diverse life as a coral reef but often taken for granted and overlooked.

Members may join on a family membership ($30), or single ($25) or youth ($10).

== Geography ==
The Greenbrier River Watershed Association currently resides in Lewisburg, West Virginia, at 120 W. Washington Street. The office serves the entirety of the Greenbrier River Watershed. A second watershed, Friends of the Lower Greenbrier River, split off from the GRWA to concentrate on riparian issues in the lower half of the watershed. Both are within the West Virginia Southern Basin, which drains to the New River at Hinton in Summers County. Their primary state assistance and consultation comes from the West Virginia Department of Environmental Protection's Southern Basin Coordinator, Jennifer Dupree.

== Counties and subwatersheds ==
Pocahontas County	Greenbrier County	Monroe County	Summers County
Knapp Creek	Milligan Creek	Second Creek	Pence Springs
Swago Creek	Spring Creek	Kitchen Creek	Eagle Branch
East Fork	Muddy Creek	Plankcabin Creek	Big Creek

== Pocahontas County: Birthplace of Rivers ==
The Greenbrier River begins at Durbin in Pocahontas County, but the watershed is involved with the upper drainage portions above Durbin, which includes places like Blister Swamp. It flows through the center of Pocahontas County, "the Birthplace of Rivers." Pocahontas County is sparsely populated, due to the Monongahela National Forest. This legally designated National Forest supports a great deal of the clean water within the watershed, and water quality degrades once the river flows out of the Forest's territory and into the more populated Greenbrier County. The spring Great Greenbrier River Race in Marlinton and summer's Durbin Days in Durbin draws large crowds every year. Pocahontas County contains much of the Greenbrier River Trail, which is the longest Rail Trail in West Virginia. The first USGS flow gauge station for the watershed is in the town of Buckeye involving Swago Creek.

== Greenbrier County: Land of Karst ==
The eastern half of Greenbrier County where the watershed rests is one of the world's densest karst stratas in the world with, "The Great Savannah" where sinkholes average at 18 km^{2}. Its water is threatened by development and ignorance of karst issues. Despite the fact that its sensitivity is a matter of record, many people claim ignorance of karst and the county government has no existing bond of commitment for its developers that would guarantee a building project will not be affected by the shifting caverns and sinkholes. The western side hosts the new Meadow River Watershed. Greenbrier County is known for its trout waters, farmland, rising development, historic 1812-and Civil War saltpetre caverns and tour caves: Lost World Caverns and Organ Cave, Inc. Many important Ice Age fossil discoveries have been found within the watershed here. Greenbrier County hosts the Riders of the Flood Outdoor Amphitheatre in Ronceverte, the State Fair of West Virginia and the Freshwater Folk Festival at the National Fish Hatchery at White Sulphur Springs, and the GRWA tries to keep its presence at both events for outreach.

== Monroe County: Land of Sinks ==
Monroe County is a rich, agriculturally blessed county with fine apple orchards, wineries, trout water, historic springs, farmland, and saltpeter caves. Since settler times it has been called "the land of sinks" for its many sinkholes. One community is called Sinks Grove because of this terrain. It contains the Second Creek Watershed, which is maintained by Friends of THE Second Creek Watershed. The birthplace of American paleontology began in the late 18th century with the discovery of the Megalonyx Jeffersonii (Thomas Jefferson's Three-toed Sloth) in its Haynes Cave. Haynes Cave is believed to be approximately 2 to 5 million years old. Monroe County has the USGS station on its side of the town of Alderson, West Virginia, where the public gleans much useful data about temperature, pH, flow, and dissolved oxygen. Much work has been launched in efforts to study the karstic hydrology of this county. Recently the entire Second Creek Watershed was designated an historic watershed by the state of West Virginia.

== Summers County: Confluence of Rivers ==
Summers County is the least karstic of all the watershed counties, with only six karstic springs and rockledges outnumbering caves. Summers County is warm, with weather influenced by the New River and many vernal pools and streams feed the lower Greenbrier in the summer. Native American summer settlements grew crops along the long, flat floodplains in areas like Pence Springs. The last USGS station is in the town of Hilldale. The Greenbrier enters the Three Rivers Confluence at Hinton where the waters of the Bluestone River, the New River, and the Greenbrier River mix. Hinton hosts a Water Festival every year. Although the Greenbrier flows into the New River at Hinton, New River biota such as the lamprey cannot travel upstream because of Sandstone Falls, the 30th-largest waterfall in the world. This helps preserve the integrity of the Greenbrier's freshwater species. The National Park Service celebrates the role of the tributaries of the New River at the Sandstone Visitors Center in Sandstone, West Virginia.

== Of Note ==
The Greenbrier provides an estimated 30% of all the water in the New River.

The state's oldest Ginkgo Biloba tree is a 133-year-old specimen planted in Lewisburg's New River Community and Technical College campus.

Railroads

Two of the three Historic Railroads in West Virginia are within the Greenbrier River Watershed: The Cass Scenic Railroad State Park and the Durbin and Greenbrier Valley Railroad. Unused railroad tracks have been restored into a 79-mile Greenbrier River Trail.
