= Knapp Creek (West Virginia) =

Location
- Country: United States
- State: West Virginia
- County: Pocahontas

Physical characteristics
- Source: Allegheny Mountain
  - location: Pocahontas County, WV
  - coordinates: 38°16′52″N 79°47′30″W
  - elevation: 3,618 ft (1,103 m)
- Mouth: Greenbrier River
  - location: Marlinton, WV
  - coordinates: 38°13′01″N 80°06′01″W
  - elevation: 2,113 ft (644 m)

Basin features
- Tributaries
  - left: Laurel Creek, Cummings Creek

Knapp Creek is a tributary stream of the Greenbrier River in Pocahontas County, West Virginia. Its source is east of the community of Frost on Allegheny Mountain. From its headwaters, Knapp Creek slowly flows down through farmland until its confluence with Laurel Creek at Minnehaha Springs. Downstream from the confluence of the two streams, Knapp Creek flows through Huntersville. Six miles from Huntersville, Knapp Creek empties into the Greenbrier River outside Marlinton.

Knapp Creek is home to the Candy Darter, Etheostoma osburni (Finescale saddled darter) a brilliantly colored, small member of the perch family sensitive to sediment.

The creek was named after Knapp Gregory, an early settler.

The forest ecology of Knapp Creek at the turn of the century is described in W. E. Blackhurst's book, Riders of the Flood, and in the theatrical version of the book for the town of Ronceverte's Outdoor Amphitheatre in September.Riders of the Flood In the book and the play, Mrs. Knapp, of the family who gave the creek its name, offers shelter to the young protagonist passing through the region.

== See also ==
- List of rivers of West Virginia
