= Knapp Creek =

Knapp Creek may refer to:

- Knapp Creek (Iowa)
- Knapp Creek (West Virginia)
