= St. Lawrence Boom and Lumber Company =

Lumber company in Ronceverte, West Virginia

Coordinates: 37°44′48″N 80°27′45″W

The St. Lawrence Boom and Manufacturing Company was a lumber company based in Ronceverte, West Virginia. It was founded in 1802 by a Colonel Cecil C. Clay, a former US Army Brigadier-General from Philadelphia.

Colonel Clay recognized the natural resources in the large stands of virgin white pine and red spruce in Pocahontas County, which today involves enormous portions of the Monongahela National Forest. At this point in history, loggers calculated that these massive forests would have time to replenish themselves by the time they cut from one side of the wilderness to the other.

White pine was an extremely useful wood. It was light, versatile, and capable of supplying many different needs in paper, furniture, and household materials. An enterprising logger could purchase a stand of promising forest, erect his own mill, cut and process the logs and float them down the river. Sawmill towns mushroomed in West Virginia and especially in its Eastern Panhandle.

The St. Lawrence Boom and Lumber Company brought the first log drive down the Greenbrier River and soon erected "The Big Mill" out of the choicest timbers. From this beginning emerged the largest softwood mill in the country. Over time, much of the Greenbrier River was harnessed for this form of heavy water-traffic. The river was sculpted with dams, spills, holding areas for the timbers, eyots to control the speed of the flow, cribs, water-pockets and sluiceways. Storage was needed for the millions of logs cut from Pocahontas and upper Greenbrier counties. As BJ Gudmundsson of Patchwork Films reported:

The Greenbrier River was harnessed at Ronceverte with dams, cribs, booms, pockets and equipment to receive and store the endless millions of logs cut from the mountains of upper Greenbrier and Pocahontas sections and floated down to feed the ravenous and unending whirling buzzing saws. They had a capacity of 110,000 board feet per day.

In 24 years the company sawed 433,000,000 board feet (1,020,000 m^{3}) of white pine. Lumberjacks worked with giant log arks 100 feet (30 m) long and special logging bateau that were tough and quick. A single error could spell disaster, and the work could be very dangerous.

Springtime floods were vital in order to float down this large amount of timber, and high water meant industry rather than inconvenience to the citizens of Ronceverte. However, the initial calculations that the forests would 'last forever' ended with the incoming superiority of the railroad. Tracklines were created, such as the Durbin & Greenbrier Valley Railroad. The trains could haul the trees out of the forests much faster than the river could float them down. The days of the rivermen were at an end.

On Saint Patrick's Day of 1908, the Greenbrier River witnessed its last log run. Pocahontas Times editor Cal Price explained in an interview by West Virginia film maker, BJ Gudmundsson for Patchwork Films, how everyone stopped what they were doing to watch the logs float down the Greenbrier River for the last time. They knew it was the end of an era. In 1911, the Weeks Act was passed, ensuring the protection of large portions of land from logging in the Monongahela National Forest. This Forest remains a large supply of clean drinking water for many watersheds. In 1915 the first 7,200 acres (29 km^{2}) were purchased.

The St. Lawrence Boom and Lumber Company is one of the "central backdrops" to the plot of Pocahontas County author W. E. Blackhurst book, "Riders of the Flood." Every September the town of Ronceverte holds an outdoor drama of Riders of the Flood just belowstream the location of the mill company.

Extensive river maps of the lower Greenbrier River (from the town of Caldwell to Hinton) and the upstream logging traces were published by the Virginia Canals & Navigation Society.

Colonel Ellery Campbell Best, who is listed in the "Prominent Men of West Virginia," joined the Company in 1882 and rose to Vice President. He later became president of the Rush River Coal Company, and mayor of Ronceverte. He encouraged the presence of the Ancient Free and Accepted Masons in Ronceverte.
