= Shryock, West Virginia =

Unincorporated community in West Virginia, United States

- Unincorporated community
- Location within West Virginia Location within the United States
- Coordinates: 37°57′17″N 80°09′01″W
- Country: United States
- State: West Virginia
- County: Greenbrier
- Elevation: 2,008 ft (612 m)
- Time zone: UTC-5 (Eastern (EST))
  - Summer (DST): UTC-4 (EDT)
- Area codes: 304 & 681
- GNIS feature ID: 1555620

Shryock is an unincorporated community in Greenbrier County, West Virginia, United States. Shryock is located on West Virginia Route 92, 13.5 miles (21.7 km) northeast of White Sulphur Springs.

The community was named after Thomas J. Shryock, an official with the St. Lawrence Boom and Lumber Company.
