= Bateau =

Colonial flat-bottomed cargo boat

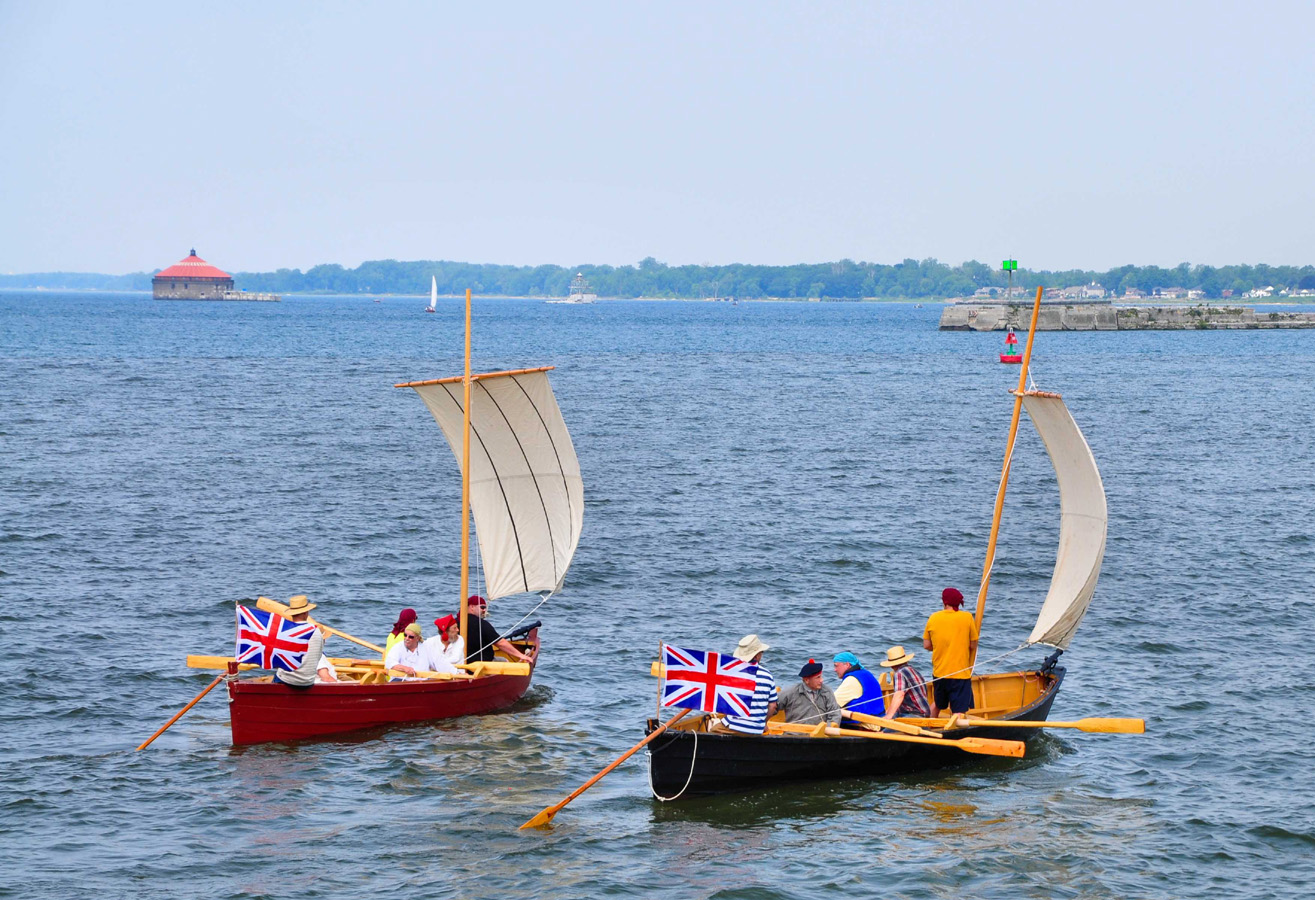

Class overview
- Builders: various
- Operators: commercial and military freight haulers
- In service: c. 1650 – c. 1850

General characteristics
- Type: Bateau
- Length: 24 to 50 ft (7.32 to 15.24 m)
- Beam: 5 to 8 ft (1.52 to 2.44 m)
- Draught: up to 1 ft (0.305 m) when loaded
- Propulsion: setting poles, oars or sail
- Speed: varied
- Capacity: 1 to 2 tons
- Complement: usually 3 or more
- Armament: none
- Notes: built to ferry freight on interior waterways of North America during the seventeenth and eighteenth centuries

A bateau or batteau is a shallow-draft, flat-bottomed boat which was used extensively across North America, especially in the colonial period and in the fur trade. It was traditionally pointed at both ends but came in a wide variety of sizes. The name derives from the French word, bateau, which is simply the word for boat and the plural, bateaux, follows the French, an unusual construction for an English plural. In the southern United States, the term is still used to refer to flat-bottomed boats, including those elsewhere called johnboats.

== Construction ==
Bateaux were flat-bottomed and double-ended. They were built with heavy stems at bow and stern and a series of frames amidships, likely from natural oak crooks when available, and planked with sawn boards, likely pine although builders would have used whatever material was available. These boats would have varied from place to place, from builder to builder and also evolved over time, however in general, they were 24 to 50 feet (7.32 to 15.24 m) long and 5 to 8 feet (1.52 to 2.44 m) wide. The bottoms were planked and flat, without a keel, but possibly with a larger "keel-plank" in the center and sometimes reinforced with cross cleats. The sides were planked, tapering to sharp at either end.

== History ==
The French explorers of North America used bateaux as well as the native canoes and cartols. The boats' shallow draft worked well in rivers while its flat bottom profile allowed heavy loading of cargoes and provided stability. The smallest batteau required only one crewman, while larger ones, reaching up to 58 feet (17.68 meters) in length, required up to five. The largest batteaux could carry two to ten tons of cargo. Batteaux could mount a small sail although the flat bottom was not optimal for sailing. In military records, it is seen that the boats were propelled primarily by oars with one oar being used at the stern as a rudder. Of Louisiana in 1763 it was described: "Beyond the mouth of the Missouri river the bateau of no prying New Orleans trader had ever penetrated." The same author wrote of the Roanoke Valley, Virginia: "One may make a pleasant voyage on the New River from this point to Eggleston's Springs, 25 miles (40 km) further down the current, taking one of the many bateaux which ply constantly on the stream, and simply drifting on the lazy wave until the destination is reached." In the same book, the spelling is given as "batteaux":

Along the Greenbrier and New Rivers adventurous boatmen ply in "batteaux", carrying merchandise or travelers who wish to explore the wonders of the New River cañon. …Our artists, who made the tour of the New River cañon in a batteau, found it an exciting experience. At the junction of the Greenbrier and New Rivers they engaged one of the boats used in running the rapids. This boat was twenty-five feet (7.62 m) long by six feet (1.83 m) wide, and was managed by three negroes,—the "steersman", who guided the boat with a long and powerful oar; the headsman, who stood on the bow to direct the steersman by waving his arms; and an extra hand, who assisted with an oar in the eddies and smooth parts of the river.

—King (1875), p. 679

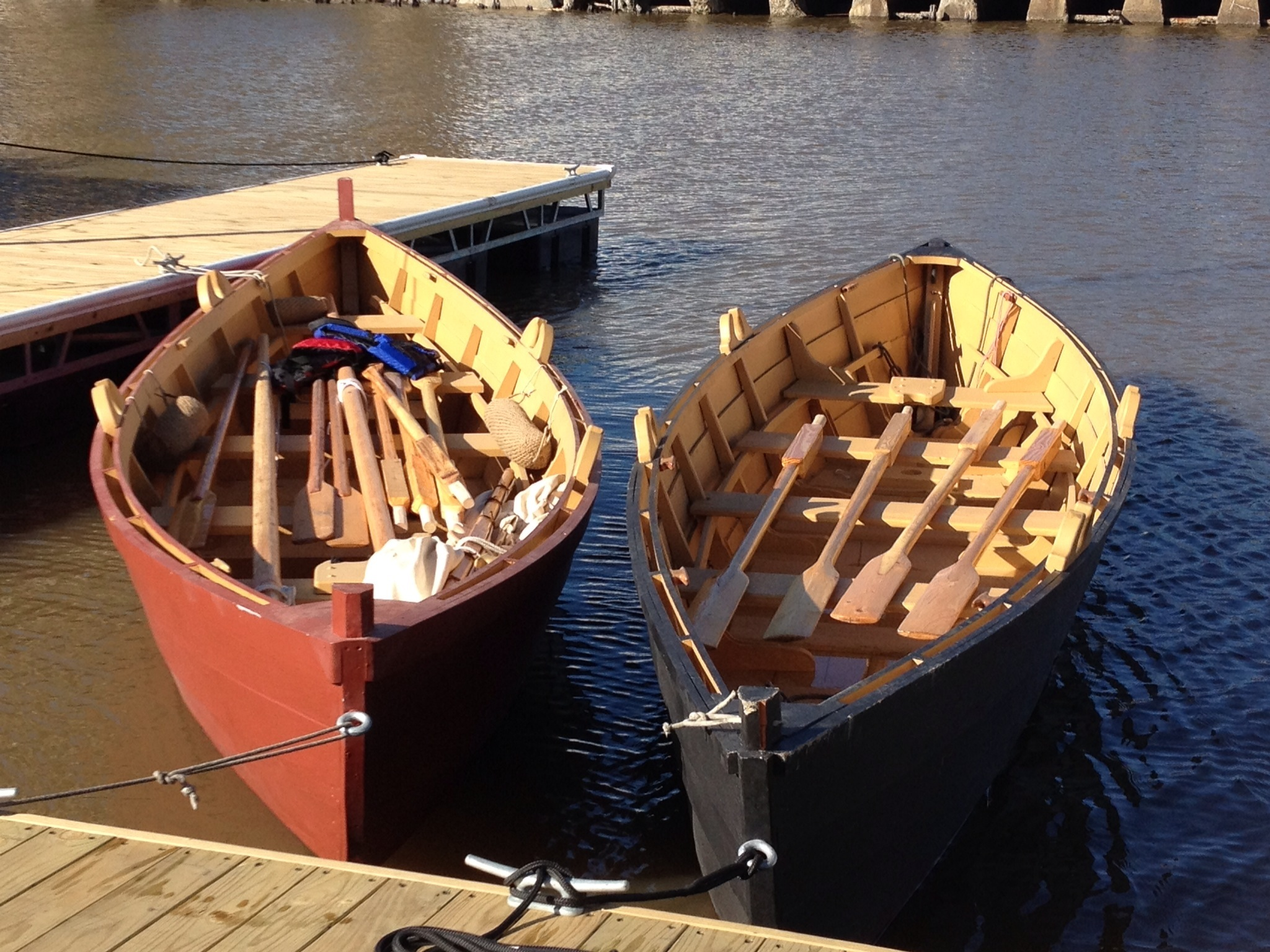
Two colonial bateaux in the Buffalo Inner Harbor. These 25-foot replicas were built based on the remains of 1756-era colonial bateaux recovered by the Adirondack Museum from Lake George in 1960.

Many types of batteaux were deployed by the Colonial French and British militaries, with the largest capable of mounting small cannon or swivel guns. In the wilderness with many rivers but few bridges, batteaux were sometimes constructed, used, then purposely sunk to prevent the enemy from discovering them and using them to raid behind the passing army. Alternately, utilizing the stability of their flat bottoms, batteau could be strung together to form pontoon bridges, which are, therefore, sometimes known as "batteau bridges". Some British military batteaux of the French and Indian War could haul twenty men or 12 barrels of supplies with a smaller crew. In the Revolutionary War, an extant plan of the British Admiralty calls for a 30-foot-4-inch (9.25-meter) batteau with a 6-foot-6-inch (1.98-meter) beam and a depth of 2 feet 10 inches (0.86 m)."

Specific designs were developed to suit local conditions. Batteaux were used as freight boats on canals in the northern U.S. until replaced by the larger canal boats in the early 1800s. James River batteaux were large craft designed for hauling tobacco on Virginia's large rivers, while Mohawk River batteau were smaller and of very shallow draft (and sometimes with awnings). Most of the inland navigations in the southern United States, penetrating the Piedmont by way of the river valleys, were for bateau.

Batteaux were a very important part of the American culture. The town of Ronceverte, West Virginia, commemorates the logging and batteau industry with an annual outdoor theater, Riders of the Flood, where the spring rains sent harvested timbers down the Greenbrier River for the sawmills.

An ark is used in the play, a scaled-down model of the original crafts that accompanied the batteaux downriver for the spring floods.

West Virginia author W. E. Blackhurst used "bateau" in his books of Pocahontas County and the Greenbrier River. These boats figure in the logging-era book Riders of the Flood, on which the play of the same name is based. This batteau was primarily for logging, meant to maneuver quickly and withstand dangerous river conditions and is built differently from the New River batteau at the confluence of the Greenbrier River.

== See also ==
- Ark (river boat)
- Boat
- Cumberland pontoon
- Durham boat
- James River bateau
- Mackinaw boat
- Punt
- York boat
