= MQI =

MQI may refer to:

- Minhaj-ul-Quran
- Mountain Quest Institute
- Dare County Regional Airport (FAA LID: MQI), North Carolina, United States
