= Second Creek =

Second Creek or Secondcreek may refer to:

- Second Creek (Adelaide), a tributary of the River Torrens, Adelaide, South Australia
- Second Creek (Greenbrier River), a stream in West Virginia
- Second Creek (Mississippi), a tributary of the Homochitto River
- Second Creek (Pocatalico River), a stream in Kanawha County, West Virginia
- Second Creek (Uwharrie River tributary), a stream in Randolph County, North Carolina
- Secondcreek, West Virginia, an unincorporated community
