= Blackhurst =

Blackhurst is a surname. Notable people with the surname include:

- Chris Blackhurst (born 1959), English journalist and newspaper editor
- Klea Blackhurst, American actress
- W. E. Blackhurst (1904–1970), American writer
