= Ronceverte Historic District =

Historic district in West Virginia, United States

- U.S. National Register of Historic Places
- U.S. Historic district
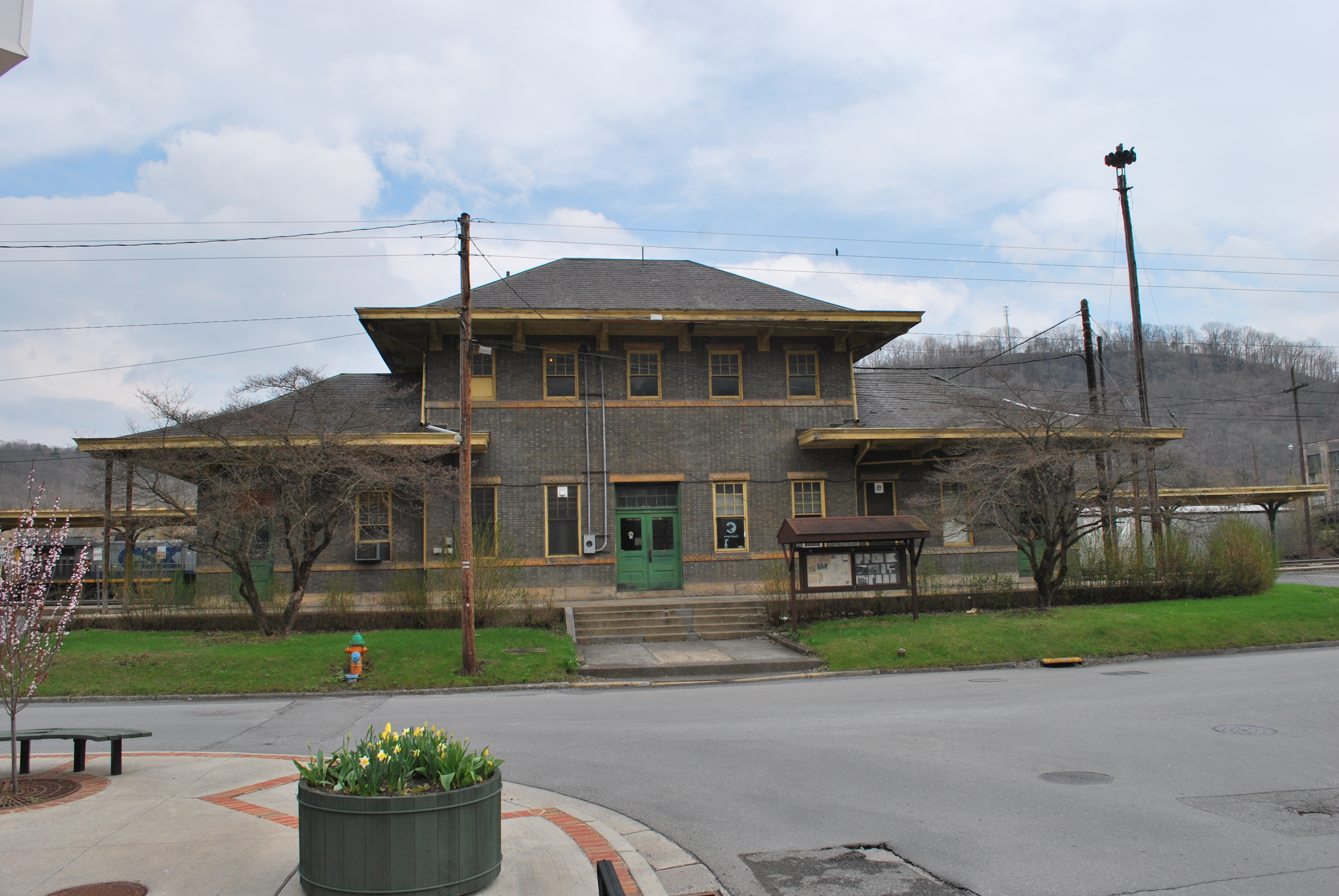
- C&O Passenger Depot, April 2009

- Location within West Virginia Location within the United States
- Location: Roughly along Main St., Pochantas, Monroe, and Greenbrier, Ronceverte, West Virginia
- Coordinates: 37°45′0″N 80°28′3″W
- Area: 109 acres (44 ha)
- Architectural style: Late 19th And 20th Century Revivals, Late 19th And Early 20th Century American Movements
- NRHP reference No.: 05000396
- Added to NRHP: May 6, 2005

Ronceverte Historic District is a historic district in Ronceverte, West Virginia, United States, that is listed on the National Register of Historic Places.

== Description ==
The district encompasses 215 contributing buildings, one contributing site, and three contributing structures located in the commercial district and surrounding residential section. It includes residential and commercial buildings, along with several churches, a historic train depot and locomotive coaling tower, one historic bridge, and several historic brick-paved streets. The oldest building is "Edgarton," built about 1832 and heavily remodeled in the 1880s. Other notable buildings are the old Ronceverte City Hall, Episcopal Church of the Incarnation (1886), Trinity Methodist Church (1880s), Grand Theater (1937), and C&O Passenger Depot (1915).

It was listed on the National Register of Historic Places May 6, 2005.

== See also ==
- National Register of Historic Places listings in Greenbrier County, West Virginia
