= Cumberland Pontoons =

Cumberland pontoons were folding pontoon bridges developed during the American Civil War to facilitate the movement of Union forces across the rivers of the Mid-South as the Federal forces advanced southward through Tennessee and Georgia.

Early pontoon bridges during the Civil War were heavy and awkward, and required special long-geared pontoon carriers to transport them to the site of the planned river crossing. There were two main types—the French-designed wooden bateau (known in the army as a "Cincinnati pontoon") and the Russian pontoon, a canvas boat. Both types were twenty-two feet in length and took considerable time to set up, requiring several men to lift into position and pin the individual sections together.

Early in 1864, the commander of the Army of the Cumberland, Major General George H. Thomas, was seeking a light-weight, easy-to-haul and erect pontoon bridge to move his troops across unfordable rivers and streams. Knowing the limitations of the two systems used by the armies in the Western Theater, he had folding pontoons developed. A similar idea had been instigated by his predecessor William S. Rosecrans earlier in the war, but had not been adopted. Captain William E. Merrill, Thomas's chief engineer, improved on Rosecrans's prototype, making it lighter and stronger. He replaced the pins that held individual sections together with hinges so that the side frame sections folded together instead of separating. The new design yielded a portable boat that was lightweight, small enough to carry on a standard supply wagon, and easier to construct in the field. It was also strong enough to support horse-drawn artillery and fully loaded wagons.

These boats soon became popularly known as Cumberland pontoons. Merrill had the first ones constructed in the army's engineer workshops in Nashville, Tennessee, under the supervision of Lieutenant James R. Willet. Soon, a train of fifty new boats was transported to the field armies. William T. Sherman used the new bridges extensively during the first two months of the Atlanta campaign, first laying them across the Etowah River. He later used them during the March to the Sea and the 1865 Carolinas campaign.
