= Mad Sheep Ridge =

Ridge in West Virginia, United States

Coordinates: 38.2601224°N 79.8525557°W

Mad Sheep Ridge is a ridge in the U.S. state of West Virginia, within the Allegheny Mountains. It is situated approximately 1.5 miles (2.4 km) northwest of Mad Sheep Summit across the state border in Virginia. The hamlet of Frost is in the valley to the north of the ridge.

Mad Sheep Ridge was so named on account of some mad sheep which roamed there, according to tradition.
