= Frost, West Virginia =

Unincorporated community in West Virginia, United States

- Unincorporated community
- Location within the state of West Virginia Frost, West Virginia (the United States)
- Coordinates: 38°16′14″N 79°52′50″W
- Country: United States
- State: West Virginia
- County: Pocahontas
- Elevation: 2,585 ft (788 m)
- Time zone: UTC-5 (Eastern (EST))
  - Summer (DST): UTC-4 (EDT)
- ZIP code: 24940
- Area code: 304/681
- GNIS feature ID: 1554516

Frost is an unincorporated community in eastern Pocahontas County, West Virginia, United States. Frost is also home to Mountain Quest Institute.

The highly elevated townsite experiences frequent frost conditions, hence the name.

== Climate ==
The climate in this area has mild differences between highs and lows, and there is adequate rainfall year-round. According to the Köppen Climate Classification system, Frost has a marine west coast climate, abbreviated "Cfb" on climate maps.

Climate data for Frost 3NE, West Virginia, 1991–2020 normals: 2905ft (885m)
| Month | Jan | Feb | Mar | Apr | May | Jun | Jul | Aug | Sep | Oct | Nov | Dec | Year |
|---|---|---|---|---|---|---|---|---|---|---|---|---|---|
| Record high °F (°C) | 67 (19) | 71 (22) | 81 (27) | 85 (29) | 88 (31) | 89 (32) | 94 (34) | 93 (34) | 89 (32) | 87 (31) | 79 (26) | 73 (23) | 94 (34) |
| Mean maximum °F (°C) | 58.8 (14.9) | 60.7 (15.9) | 70.7 (21.5) | 79.8 (26.6) | 82.4 (28.0) | 84.9 (29.4) | 86.1 (30.1) | 84.8 (29.3) | 83.9 (28.8) | 78.7 (25.9) | 70.5 (21.4) | 60.9 (16.1) | 87.5 (30.8) |
| Mean daily maximum °F (°C) | 37.4 (3.0) | 41.5 (5.3) | 49.0 (9.4) | 60.8 (16.0) | 69.3 (20.7) | 75.0 (23.9) | 78.4 (25.8) | 78.2 (25.7) | 72.8 (22.7) | 63.3 (17.4) | 51.6 (10.9) | 41.5 (5.3) | 59.9 (15.5) |
| Daily mean °F (°C) | 27.2 (−2.7) | 29.9 (−1.2) | 37.4 (3.0) | 47.4 (8.6) | 56.4 (13.6) | 63.3 (17.4) | 67.1 (19.5) | 66.7 (19.3) | 60.7 (15.9) | 50.3 (10.2) | 39.6 (4.2) | 31.4 (−0.3) | 48.1 (9.0) |
| Mean daily minimum °F (°C) | 17.0 (−8.3) | 18.4 (−7.6) | 25.8 (−3.4) | 34.0 (1.1) | 43.6 (6.4) | 51.7 (10.9) | 55.8 (13.2) | 55.1 (12.8) | 48.5 (9.2) | 37.2 (2.9) | 27.6 (−2.4) | 21.3 (−5.9) | 36.3 (2.4) |
| Mean minimum °F (°C) | −4.2 (−20.1) | −1.2 (−18.4) | 8.4 (−13.1) | 20.5 (−6.4) | 28.0 (−2.2) | 40.2 (4.6) | 46.1 (7.8) | 45.6 (7.6) | 35.1 (1.7) | 24.0 (−4.4) | 13.4 (−10.3) | 4.6 (−15.2) | −5.4 (−20.8) |
| Record low °F (°C) | −12 (−24) | −12 (−24) | −7 (−22) | 14 (−10) | 23 (−5) | 33 (1) | 41 (5) | 40 (4) | 29 (−2) | 17 (−8) | 4 (−16) | −3 (−19) | −12 (−24) |
| Average precipitation inches (mm) | 3.50 (89) | 3.04 (77) | 4.50 (114) | 4.20 (107) | 5.25 (133) | 5.07 (129) | 4.41 (112) | 3.59 (91) | 3.95 (100) | 3.11 (79) | 3.20 (81) | 3.97 (101) | 47.79 (1,213) |
| Average snowfall inches (cm) | 11.60 (29.5) | 14.30 (36.3) | 10.00 (25.4) | 1.60 (4.1) | 0.00 (0.00) | 0.00 (0.00) | 0.00 (0.00) | 0.00 (0.00) | 0.00 (0.00) | 0.40 (1.0) | 2.90 (7.4) | 10.30 (26.2) | 51.1 (129.9) |
Source 1: NOAA
Source 2: XMACIS (temp records & monthly max/mins)

== See also ==
- Allegheny Mountain (West Virginia–Virginia)
- Mad Sheep Ridge
