= Talcott, West Virginia =

- Unincorporated community
- Location within West Virginia Location within the United States
- Coordinates: 37°39′05″N 80°45′15″W
- Country: United States
- State: West Virginia
- County: Summers
- Elevation: 1,526 ft (465 m)
- Time zone: UTC-5 (Eastern (EST))
  - Summer (DST): UTC-4 (EDT)
- ZIP code: 24981
- Area codes: 304 & 681
- GNIS feature ID: 1547876

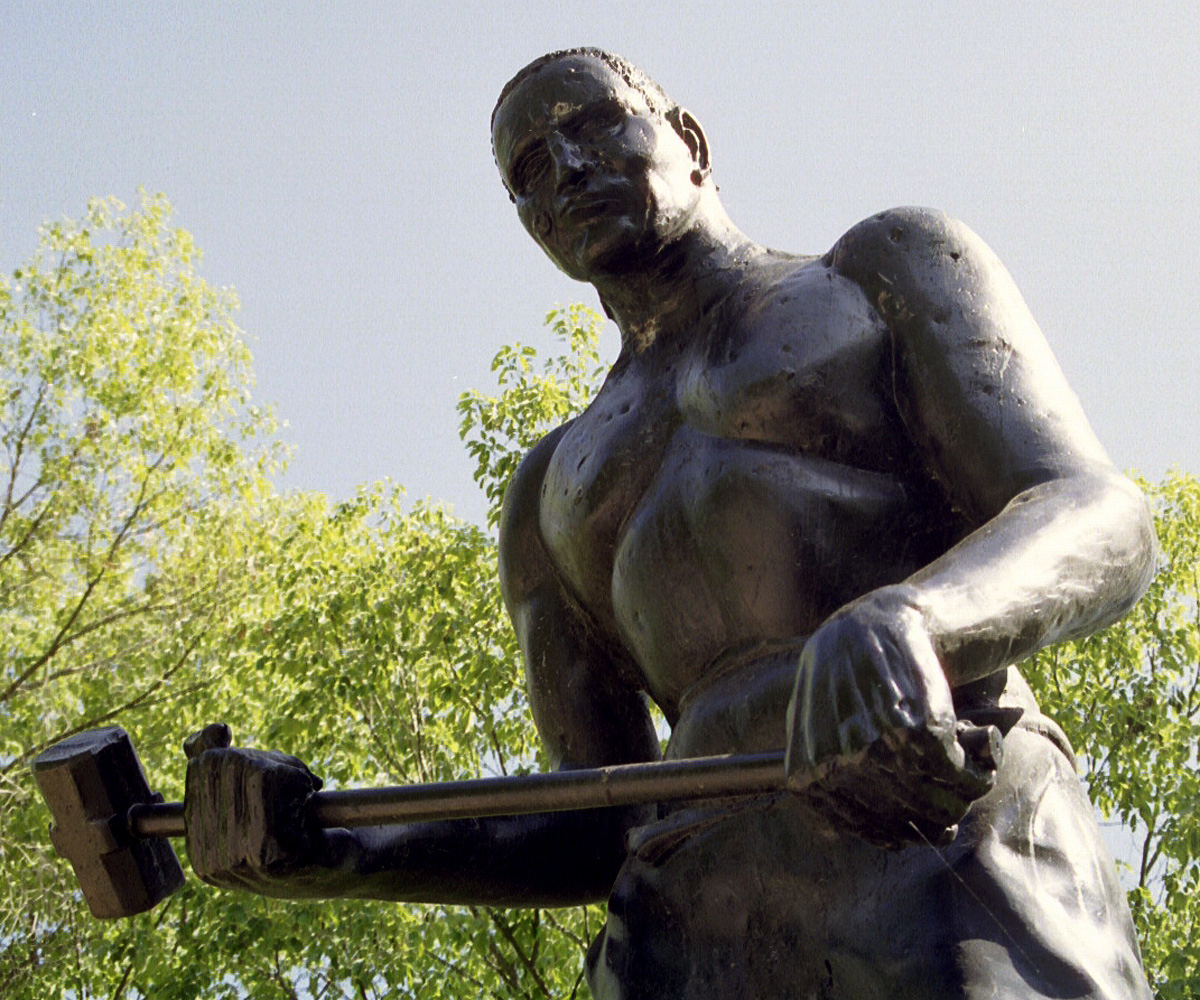
Statue of John Henry outside the town of Talcott in Summers County, WV

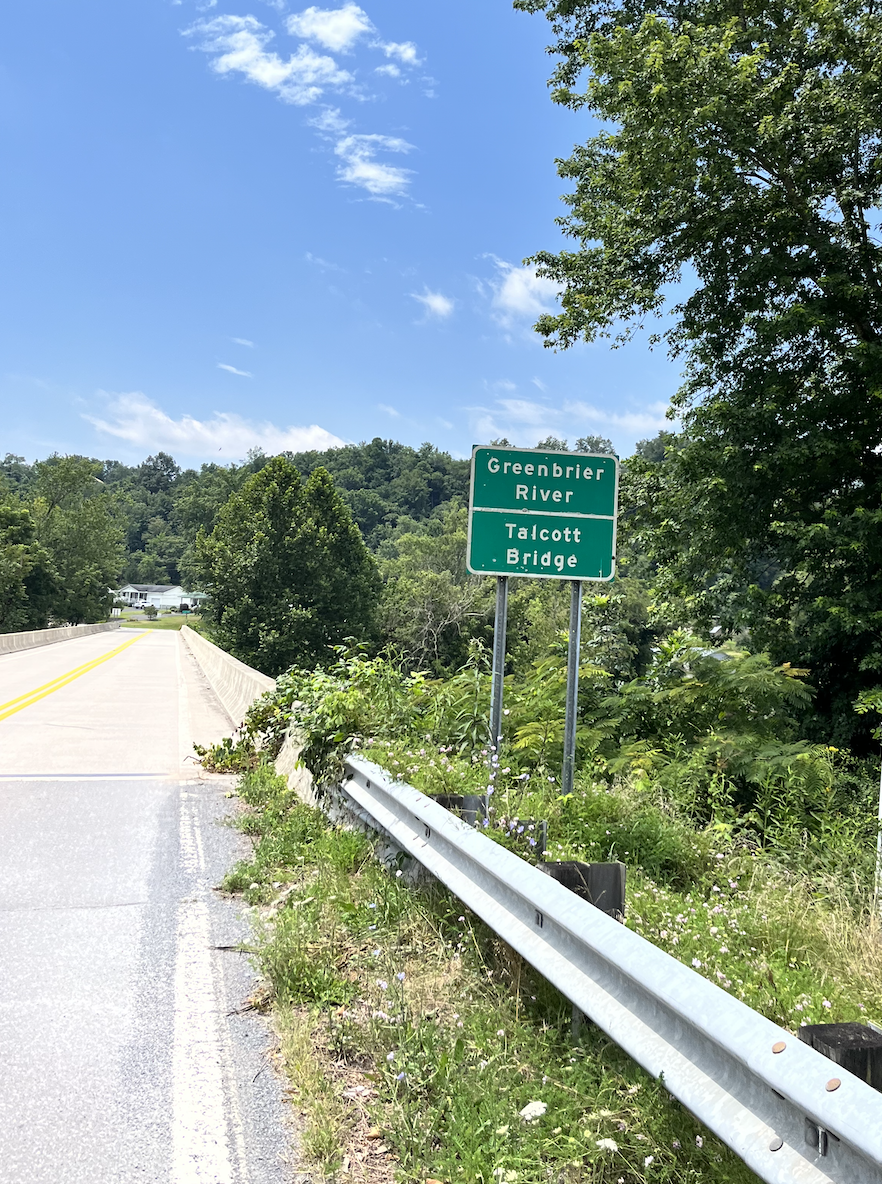
The Talcott Bridge, crossing the Greenbrier heading south

Talcott (also Rolinsburgh or Rollinsburg) is an unincorporated community in Summers County, West Virginia, United States.

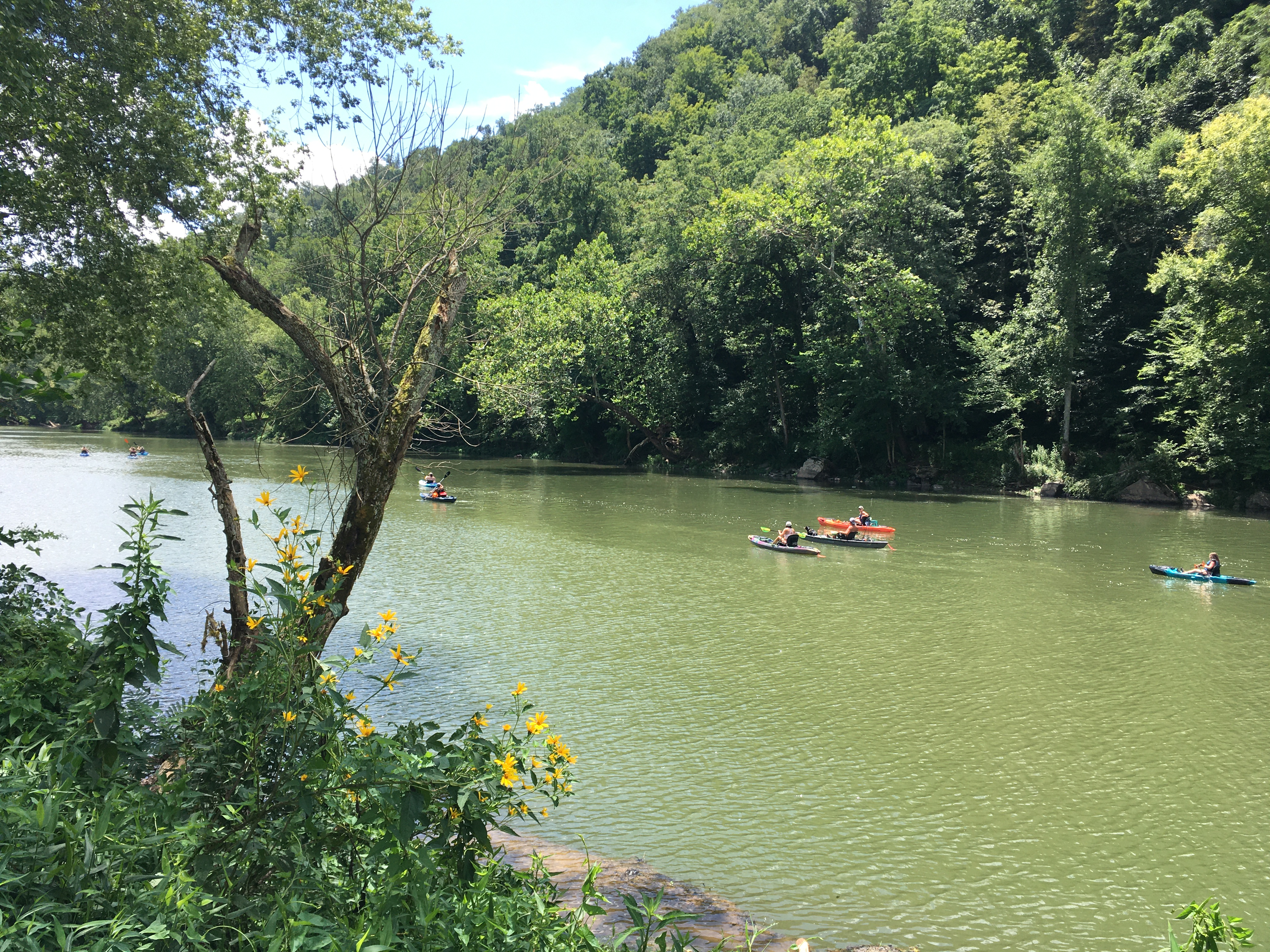
The Greenbrier River south of the Talcott Bridge

It lies along West Virginia Route 3 and the Greenbrier River to the east of the city of Hinton, the county seat of Summers County. Its elevation is 1,526 feet (465 m), and it is located at about 37°39′2″N 80°45′4″W (37.6506762, -80.7511921). It has a post office with the ZIP code 24981.

== History ==
Talcott is named for Capt. Talcott, a civil engineer with the Chesapeake and Ohio Railway who was in charge of building the Big Bend Tunnel.

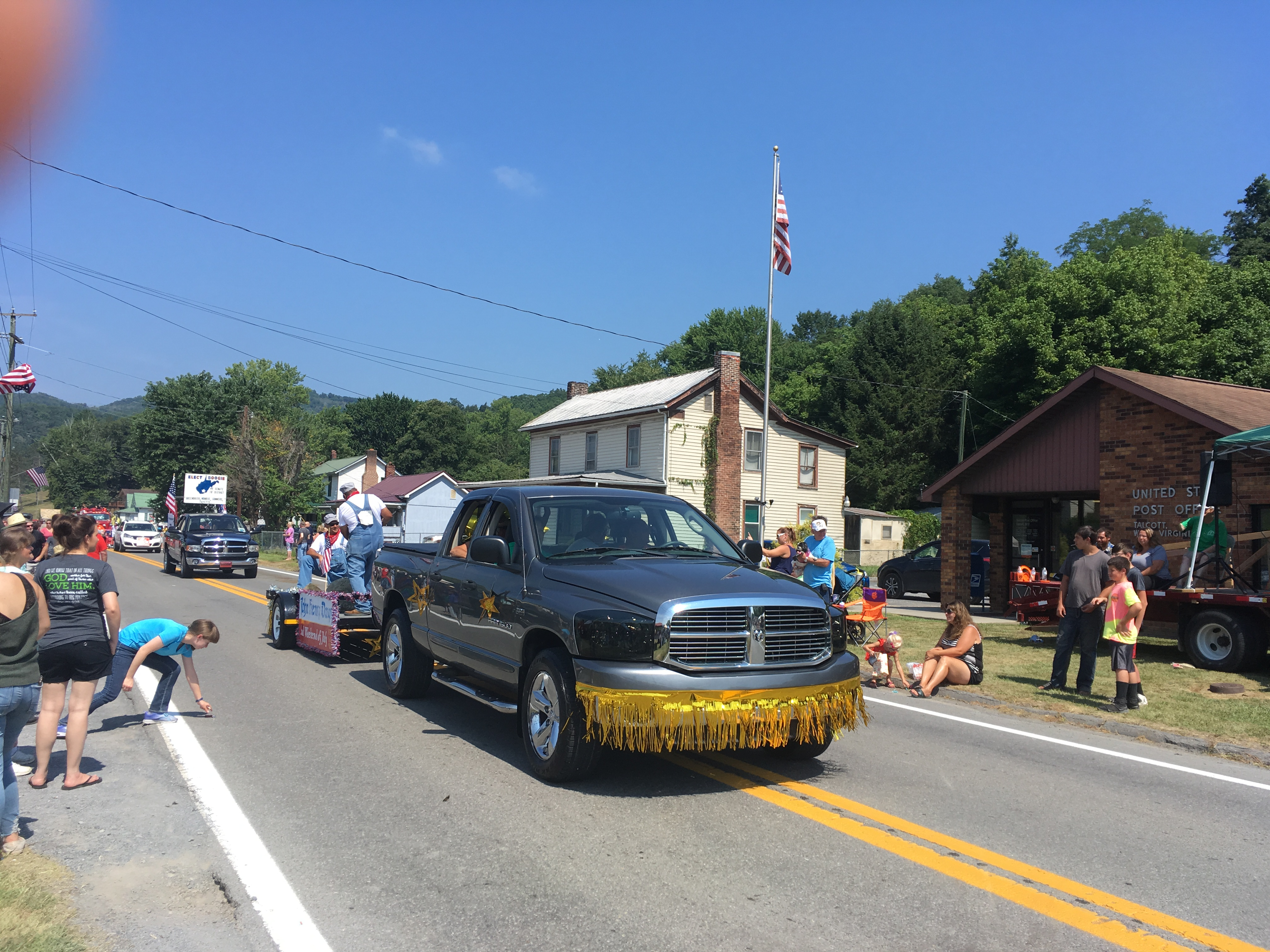
4th of July Parade along Rt. 3 in Talcott, WV.

=== John Henry legend ===
Talcott has gained some fame for being what many in the area consider to be the home of the John Henry legend. Henry was an African-American railroad worker in the 1800s who supposedly competed in a legendary race with a steam-powered drill bit, and won, dying in the process. Historian Louis Chappell traveled to Talcott in the 1920s and interviewed railroad workers who claimed to have worked with Henry when building the Great Bend tunnel on the C&O line through Talcott (at 6,452 feet, it was the longest tunnel on the C&O line). The accounts of the surviving workers seemed to corroborate that Henry was, in fact, a real person, although the other aspects to the legend were impossible to confirm or deny based on the interviews conducted by Chappell.

The Hilldale-Talcott Ruritan Club raised a statue of Henry atop Big Bend mountain in 1972 to commemorate the legend. The statue now stands outside of the Great Bend Tunnel (the tunnel was completed on September 12, 1872, remaining in service until 1974), in John Henry Park. Talcott now hosts an annual John Henry Days festival each July that features re-tellings of the famous legend, duck races, craft booths, and other festivities.

== Recreation and activities ==
Talcott lies along the lower Greenbrier River. As a river community, activities revolve around fishing, boating, and canoeing. A public boat ramp is located next to the Talcott Bridge, and this is a popular starting point for float trips down the Greenbrier to Hinton, WV. Fishing camps and summer houses line the river in the area.
