= Fort Spring, West Virginia =

Unincorporated community in West Virginia, United States

- Unincorporated community
- Location within West Virginia Location within the United States
- Coordinates: 37°44′42″N 80°32′21″W
- Country: United States
- State: West Virginia
- County: Greenbrier
- Elevation: 1,637 ft (499 m)
- Time zone: UTC-5 (Eastern (EST))
  - Summer (DST): UTC-4 (EDT)
- GNIS feature ID: 1539161

Fort Spring is an unincorporated community and town in Greenbrier County, West Virginia, United States, situated along the Greenbrier River within the Greenbrier River Watershed. It was once a major segment of the Chesapeake and Ohio Railway's "Gravel Girtie" route between Hinton in Summers County to Clifton Forge, Virginia. The name is derived from its main export; Mississippian limestone from Snowflake Quarry, sent to Clifton Forge for further transshipment. The main road going through the small town was once the original rail line, which was re-located.

Fort Spring was originally called "Mann's Ferry" and the community's current name refers to the old settler fort that has been lost to history. The rock cliff, or bluff, seen just prior to the primary two train tunnels when traveling eastward, was named 'Wilson's Bluff' due to a family settled there. Colonel John Stuart, who once commanded the old fort as well as shipped Ice Age sloth bones (Megalonyx jeffersonii) to Thomas Jefferson, noted the presence of saltpeter caves in the area. The area is a combination of karst topography, riparian floodplain and ancient riverbeds with limestone (karst) outcropping mixing with farmlands and deciduous forest. Drinking water is not from the nearby river but by drilled wells, rainwater cisterns or transported from elsewhere.

Due to recent West Virginia tourism promotions, Fort Spring is known as a set-in point for kayaks and other boats used on day trips to the nearby town of Alderson.

== See also ==
- Greenbrier River
- Greenbrier River Watershed Association

== Sources ==
- Jones, William K. "The Karst Hydrology Atlas of West Virginia
- Jones, William K. "Hydrology of Limestone Karst." 1973
- McCue, J. B., Lucke, and Woodward, H.P., 1939, WVGES
- "Greenbrier County" 1939 United States Geological Survey
- "What is this Thing, Thomas Jefferson?" Wilson, Marcia 2005 Unpublished Thesis
