= Hungard Creek =

Stream in West Virginia, U.S.

Coordinates: 37°39′02″N 80°45′41″W

Hungard Creek is a stream in the U.S. state of West Virginia.

Hungard Creek was named for an early settler named Hungard or Hungart.

== See also ==
- List of rivers of West Virginia
