= Sunday Lick Run =

Stream in West Virginia, U.S.

Coordinates: 38°11′42″N 80°05′57″W

Sunday Lick Run is a stream in the U.S. state of West Virginia.

According to local history, Sunday Lick Run was named for an incident when a hunt was conducted on a Sunday, breaking local religious taboo.

== See also ==
- List of rivers of West Virginia
