= Paddy Knob =

Mountain in West Virginia & Virginia, USA

Coordinates: 38.2662°N 79.7958°W

Paddy Knob is a summit in Virginia and West Virginia, in the United States. With an elevation of 4,478 feet (1,365 m), Paddy Knob is the 29th highest summit in the state of West Virginia, and the 14th highest in Virginia.

Paddy Knob derives its name from "paddy", which meant "bear" in African American Vernacular English.
