= Cummings Creek =

Stream in West Virginia, U.S.

Coordinates: 38°11′53″N 80°01′26″W

Cummings Creek is a stream in the U.S. state of West Virginia.

Cummings Creek was named after the local Cummings family.

== See also ==
- List of rivers of West Virginia
