= Arbovale, West Virginia =

Unincorporated community in West Virginia, United States

- Census-designated place
- Location within West Virginia Location within the United States
- Coordinates: 38°26′07″N 79°49′03″W
- Country: United States
- State: West Virginia
- County: Pocahontas
- Elevation: 2,726 ft (831 m)

Population (2020)
  - Total: 134
- Time zone: UTC-5 (Eastern (EST))
  - Summer (DST): UTC-4 (EDT)
- ZIP code: 24915
- Area codes: 304 & 681
- GNIS feature ID: 1553737

Arbovale is an unincorporated community in Pocahontas County, West Virginia, United States. Arbovale is 12 miles (19 km) south of Durbin. Arbovale had a post office, which closed on March 3, 2007. As a census-designated place, the population at the 2020 census was 134.

Arbovale derives its name from Adam Arbogast, who settled in the vale where the town site is situated.

== Climate ==
The climate in this area has mild differences between highs and lows, and there is adequate rainfall year-round. According to the Köppen Climate Classification system, Arbovale has a marine west coast climate, abbreviated "Cfb" on climate maps.
