= Mountain Quest Institute =

Coordinates: 38°16′22″N 79°53′30″W

The Mountain Quest Institute (MQI) is a research, retreat and conference center (both business and academic) on 450 acres (1.8 km^{2}) in Pocahontas County, West Virginia (in Frost, near Marlinton) in the Allegheny Mountains of the United States. MQI claims three "quests": the Quest for Knowledge, the Quest for Meaning, and the Quest for Consciousness. MQI promotes itself as scientific, humanistic and spiritual and claims to find no contradiction in this combination.

The Institute's inn, built at an angle to preserve some ancient trees, is connected to the original 1905 farmhouse by covered porches. Each room has an individual theme, such as the 'Nautical Room' (which features model ships and a water bed). The complex includes: a meeting room, break-out rooms, a computer room, a game room, a sauna and jacuzzi, a tower, and a two-story library. There are hiking trails and morning visits with the horses (six of which have been born on the farm) and llamas. A labyrinth for walking meditation is a more recent addition.

The Institute's founders are Alex and David Bennet (who has degrees in neuroscience and atomic physics), organizational development and knowledge management professionals who are also the co-authors of Organizational Survival in the New World: The Intelligent Complex Adaptive System. and Knowledge Mobilization in the Social Sciences and Humanities: Moving from Research to Action.
