= Knapp Creek (Iowa) =

Stream in Iowa, U.S.

Coordinates: 41.865489°N 91.832303°W

Knapp Creek is a stream in the U.S. state of Iowa. It is a tributary to the Iowa River.

Knapp Creek most likely was named after a pioneer settler with the surname Knapp.
