= Price Run =

Stream in West Virginia, U.S.

Coordinates: 38°13′20″N 80°05′55″W

Price Run is a stream in the U.S. state of West Virginia.

The stream was named after the local Price family.

== See also ==
- List of rivers of West Virginia
