= Swago Creek =

Stream in West Virginia, U.S.

Coordinates: 38°11′10″N 80°07′51″W

Swago Creek is a stream in the U.S. state of West Virginia.

Swago Creek derives its name by shortening Oswego.

== See also ==
- List of rivers of West Virginia
