= Second Creek (Pocatalico River tributary) =

Stream in the American state of West Virginia

Coordinates: 38°31′34″N 81°38′38″W

Second Creek is a stream in Kanawha County, West Virginia. It is a tributary of the Pocatalico River.

First Creek was the second nearest creek to a pioneer settlement, hence the name.

== See also ==
- List of rivers of West Virginia
