= W. E. Blackhurst =

American writer

- Born: Warren Elmer Blackhurst; October 10, 1904; Arbovale, West Virginia
- Died: October 5, 1970 (aged 65); Cass, West Virginia
- Education: Glenville State University
- Occupations: author, English teacher
- Spouse: Stella May Yates (1917–2000) married (1934–1970, his death)
- Children: one unnamed son (1940)
- Relatives: Harry and Lula May Blackhurst (parents)

Warren Elmer "Tweard" Blackhurst (1904–1970) was an author and a lifelong resident of the Cass community who centered on the culture of eastern West Virginia where the higher elevations supported northern pine forests. "Riders of the Flood," arguably the most well-known of Blackhurst's books, centers on the world of the late 19th to early 20th-century logging industry in eastern West Virginia through the Greenbrier River and its tributaries.

== Life and upbringing ==
Blackhurst was born on October 10, 1904, in Arbovale, West Virginia, to Rev. Harry Blackhurst (1870–1956) and his wife Lula May née Burner (1870–1960). His father, an immigrant from Tunstall, England, came to America in 1886 with his parents Jabez (1843–1914) and Sarah (1842–1924), and Warren's mother was an American-born native of Pocahontas County, West Virginia. Warren was the seventh of eleven children. While a student at Green Bank High School, he fell in love with a fellow student Annie Moates, and some of his schoolmates called him "Moates" to tease him about his unrequited love for Annie. The name stuck, and for the rest of his life, he never went by Warren, but by either Moates or "Tweard." Warren spent nearly his entire life close to the lumber industry, and knew the intricacies of this industry like few other people. Even more remarkably, he was able to portray the logging workers in a realistic light. Whether they are the blustering bully about to get drunk and rip a town apart just because it is payday, or a young man trying to make something of himself, the characters sounded like actual people who one might already know. As a native of West Virginia, Blackhurst knew when was self-parody and when it would ring false.

Blackhurst was a graduate of Green Bank High School and Glenville State College, attended West Virginia University and the Davis and Elkins College. He returned to his Alma mater (Green Bank) and taught English and Latin for thirty-two years. He married Stella Mae Yates (1917–2000) on June 25, 1934, and they moved into a house his elder brother Henry O'Dell Blackhurst (1895–1989) and father had built together a few years prior. On July 25, 1940, their only child, an unnamed boy, was born in Cass, and only lived a few minutes before being asphyxiated by the afterbirth. He and his wife operated the Wildlife Museum in Cass.

Blackhurst devoted much of his life to collecting and writing the history of the early logging days. At the time of his birth in 1904, the lumber business was just seriously getting underway in the Greenbrier Valley following the completion of the C&O Railway's Greenbrier Branch. One location in his books, the town of Cass, was created by the West Virginia Pulp and Paper Company, and Blackhurst grew up during the most active years of that company in the valley.

== List of books (taken from Your Train Ride Through History) ==
- Afterglow (published posthumously)
- Mixed Harvest
- Riders of the Flood (book) Published in 1954
- Sawdust in Your Eyes
- Of Men and a Mighty Mountain
- Your Train Ride Through History

=== Riders of the Flood ===
Riders of the Flood, the outdoor drama, was written by Greenbrier County native and artist, Robert Tuckwiller. It is based on the book of the same title by the late W. E. Blackhurst of Cass, West Virginia. Set during the bygone era when logging camps were plentiful, and loggers risked their lives to drive logs down the Greenbrier River, Riders of the Flood tells the tale of one young man who, down on his luck, is forced to leave the big city and start a new life. He sets off to join a logging camp, not only to find work, but more importantly, to find himself. His journey winds its way through the Greenbrier River Valley, over Droop Mountain, in to Pocahontas County, and on to the high mountain country beyond. Along the way he finds adventure, romance, and success.

Every September the nonprofit organization, Riders of the Flood, hosts this outdoor drama to critical success in Ronceverte, West Virginia. Its sequel, "Big Dreams, Restless Spirit" is equally well received. The theatre is built along the banks of the Greenbrier River and occasional floods have disrupted the showtimes.

==== Summary ====
The main protagonist, Duncan “Dunk” Mall is quickly moved by his unexpected collapse in fortunes to take the next train out of Washington, D.C. He falls asleep in the freight-car of a Chesapeake & Ohio train and wakes up in Ronceverte, West Virginia. After learning of his plight, Bill Brake (the local cook of the diner) gave him a large meal, clothes from a dead man, and a few dollars so he can get started as a man who can possibly make his way in the logging industry. He follows the railroad tracks northeast out of Greenbrier County to a future in Pocahontas County.

Duncan soon falls in with the St. Lawrence Boom and Lumber Company, which owns the sawmill in Ronceverte. He soon becomes one of the crew and learns their ways, encountering colorful characters such as Windy Hammer, a man as skilled in tall tales as he is in his craft, Tad Stevens and Jim Noonan. As he learns the ways of timbering, he grows stronger in body, mind, and spirit. He falls in love with Martha Mendell, the beautiful daughter of his employer's business partner. Romantic tension is supplied by Arthur Hennessey, the son of a former Virginia governor. Wealthy, pampered and callous, Arthur Hennessey is a darker aspect of Duncan 's former social rung. He is unaware that his ignorance of the so-called 'common man' has left him just as ignorant of the values of life.

At the end of the play, Duncan and his friends start up their own sawmill. Duncan marries Martha after her mother dies of consumption.

Riders on the Flood is performed solely in the Island Park Amphitheatre of Ronceverte, West Virginia—the same town and locale that saw the true lumbering industry during the latter half of the 19th century.

== Historical work ==
Riders of the Flood is an historical work that involves romance, the pride of the working man, drama, and rollicking humor. Through it all the Greenbrier River and its northern tributaries of the watershed are the backdrop that unites everyone, rich or poor, friend or enemy. Blackhurst's books are spiced with historical photographs that emphasize the now-alien world where entire rivers were choked with giant logs and one's livelihood depended on spring floods.

The town of Ronceverte hosts the theater version of "Riders of the Flood" every September just downstream from the original site of the St. Lawrence Broom and Lumber Mill in Blackhurst's books. The play was written by a local artist, Robert Tuckwiller, who was given an out-of-print copy of the book by his father. Mr. Tuckwiller was so inspired by the book he wrote up the play and garnered permission to use it from Blackhurst's family. Riders of the Flood is now back in print and the theater provides revenue for the improvements of the city.
