= Ronceverte, West Virginia =

City in West Virginia, US

- City
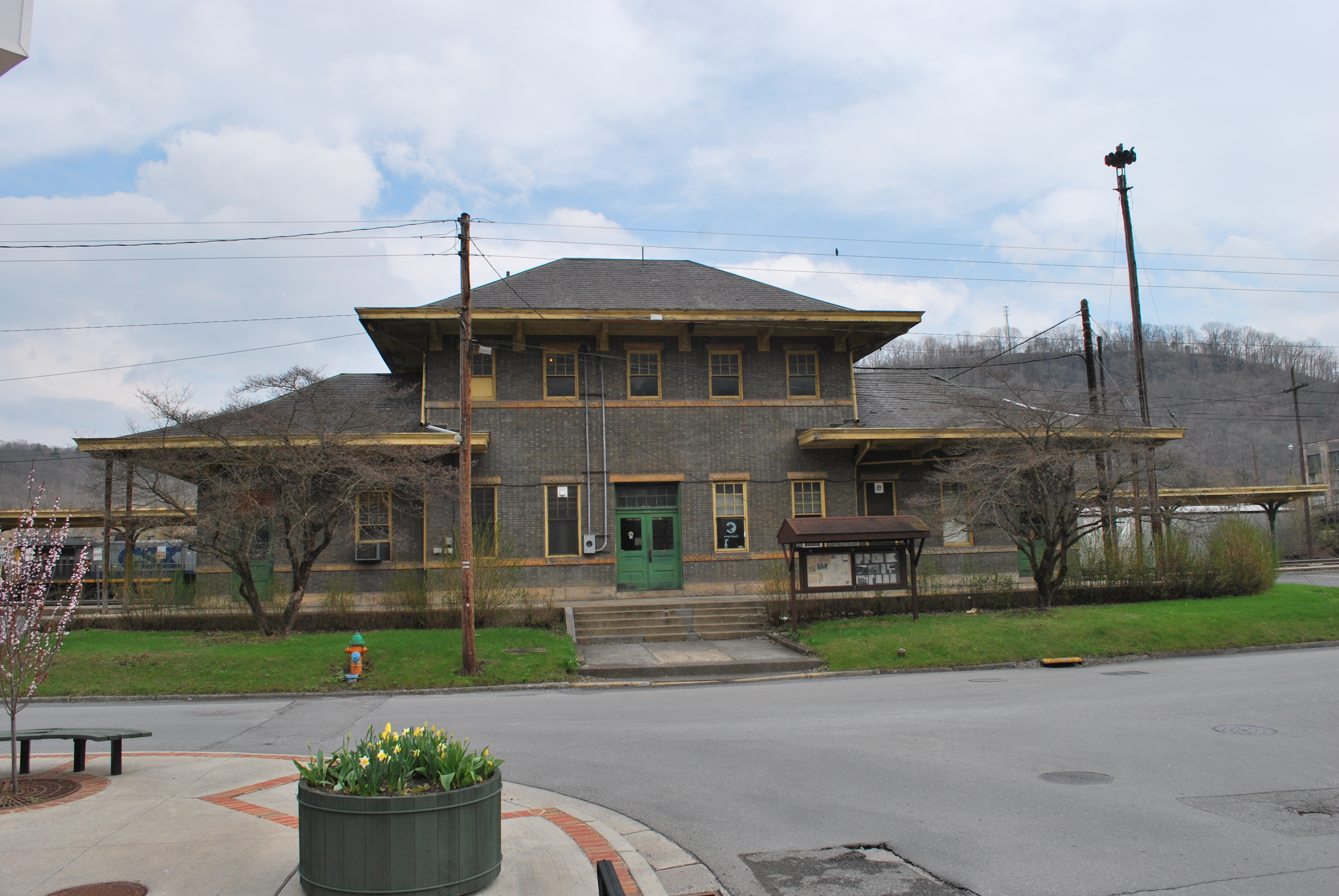
- Ronceverte Depot, April 2009

- Seal
- Nickname: The Friendly River City
- Location of Ronceverte in Greenbrier County, West Virginia.
- Coordinates: 37°44′46″N 80°28′32″W
- Country: United States
- State: West Virginia
- County: Greenbrier
- Incorporated: 1882

Government
  - Mayor: Deena Pack

Area
  - Total: 1.73 sq mi (4.48 km^{2})
  - Land: 1.70 sq mi (4.41 km^{2})
  - Water: 0.023 sq mi (0.06 km^{2})
- Elevation: 1,723 ft (525 m)

Population (2020)
  - Total: 1,572
  - Estimate (2021): 1,559
  - Density: 980.2/sq mi (378.46/km^{2})
- Time zone: UTC-5 (Eastern (EST))
  - Summer (DST): UTC-4 (EDT)
- ZIP code: 24970
- Area code: 304
- FIPS code: 54-70156
- GNIS feature ID: 2390647
- Website: cityofroncevertewv.gov

Ronceverte is a city in Greenbrier County, West Virginia, United States, on the Greenbrier River. The population was 1,572 at the 2020 census.

== Culture and history ==
Ronceverte might have been named "Edgar", for the high number of Edgars who lived in the town, but the name was settled by a leading entrepreneur of the area, Cecil Clay, president of the St. Lawrence Boom and Manufacturing Company. According to Clay, he saw the name on an old Jesuit map from Fort Duquesne. His argument was that the name "looked well in print and was euphonious in sound." As the owner of the town's site, Clay argued he had the right to decide on the name, but the residents could change the name to whatever they wanted once Ronceverte was fully established. That day has never happened. Since April 1, 1882, the town has been Ronceverte.

Ronceverte is French for "Bramble Green", which is the Gallic equivalent for "Greenbrier". Greenbriers are a common vine (Smilax rotundifolia), and a humorous myth has it the surveyors were trapped in a thicket of the painful vines when they discovered the Greenbrier River. French surveyors were likely the first cartographers for the area, although many of the details have been lost to history.

The river is still inseparable from the culture of the town itself, considered one of the earliest significant river ports in the Greenbrier River watershed. Ronceverte has been significantly impacted by the Greenbrier River flooding in 1985, 1996, and 2016.

The Hokes Mill Covered Bridge was listed on the National Register of Historic Places in 1981. The Ronceverte Historic District was listed in 2005.

== Railroad ==
Ronceverte is a railroad town, a part of the C&O lines that connected Pocahontas County to Hinton, and to Clifton Forge, Virginia. Ronceverte was part of the "Gravel Girtie" line where Hinton-based train cars were sent to the limestone quarry at Fort Spring and loaded with crushed lime. This cargo was sent to Clifton Forge where it fluxed in the large furnaces.

During World War II the tracks carried German prisoners of war to areas like local farms and projects. One of the depots for the area, the Rockland Depot, has been lost to history and only the name of Rockland Road in Ronceverte remains.

== Geography ==
According to the United States Census Bureau, the city has a total area of 1.73 square miles (4.48 km^{2}), of which 1.70 square miles (4.40 km^{2}) is land and 0.03 square miles (0.08 km^{2}) is water.

== Demographics ==
Historical population
Census	Pop.	Note	%±
1880	395		—
1890	481		21.8%
1900	968		101.2%
1910	2,157		122.8%
1920	2,319		7.5%
1930	2,254		−2.8%
1940	2,265		0.5%
1950	2,301		1.6%
1960	1,882		−18.2%
1970	1,981		5.3%
1980	2,312		16.7%
1990	1,754		−24.1%
2000	1,557		−11.2%
2010	1,765		13.4%
2020	1,572		−10.9%
2021 (est.)	1,559		−0.8%
U.S. Decennial Census

Ronceverte's economic area is in the downtown section, crossed with railroad tracks for the former Chesapeake & Ohio and a large floodplain that causes occasional adjustment for its citizens. Grants from Tony Hawk and the Izaak Walton League have allowed this public area to grow for the health and recreational opportunities for its citizens. A ball field, swimming pool, playground, interpretive walk and walking track appeal to all ages adjacent to a public access point of the Greenbrier River, where picnickers are welcome. The county's recycling depot is close by, encouraging further business from a large area. The public access includes a boat launch for swimmers and fishers, and an outdoor amphitheater. Every June this area is inundated with the Ronceverte River Festival, where a unique raffle is held by floating hundreds of small, numbered yellow ducks into the river. The winning duck can be a cash prize or a new truck; runners-up are gifts from local businesses to support county interests.

=== 2020 census ===
As of the 2020 census, Ronceverte had a population of 1,572. The median age was 39.7 years. 22.9% of residents were under the age of 18 and 17.9% of residents were 65 years of age or older. For every 100 females there were 92.2 males, and for every 100 females age 18 and over there were 86.7 males age 18 and over.

97.7% of residents lived in urban areas, while 2.3% lived in rural areas.

There were 679 households in Ronceverte, of which 32.0% had children under the age of 18 living in them. Of all households, 36.7% were married-couple households, 19.6% were households with a male householder and no spouse or partner present, and 36.1% were households with a female householder and no spouse or partner present. About 33.2% of all households were made up of individuals and 15.2% had someone living alone who was 65 years of age or older.

There were 811 housing units, of which 16.3% were vacant. The homeowner vacancy rate was 4.0% and the rental vacancy rate was 6.6%.

Racial composition as of the 2020 census
Race	Number	Percent
White	1,388	88.3%
Black or African American	91	5.8%
American Indian and Alaska Native	2	0.1%
Asian	8	0.5%
Native Hawaiian and Other Pacific Islander	1	0.1%
Some other race	13	0.8%
Two or more races	69	4.4%
Hispanic or Latino (of any race)	37	2.4%

=== 2010 census ===
As of the census of 2010, there were 1,765 people, 753 households, and 446 families living in the city. The population density was 1,038.2 inhabitants per square mile (400.9/km^{2}). There were 866 housing units at an average density of 509.4 units per square mile (196.7 units/km^{2}). The racial makeup of the city was 92.7% White, 5.6% African American, 0.1% Native American, 0.2% Asian, 0.1% from other races, and 1.3% from two or more races. Hispanic or Latino of any race were 1.1% of the population.

There were 753 households, of which 29.1% had children under the age of 18 living with them, 41.6% were married couples living together, 13.0% had a female householder with no husband present, 4.6% had a male householder with no wife present, and 40.8% were non-families. 34.4% of all households were made up of individuals, and 15.5% had someone living alone who was 65 years of age or older. The average household size was 2.23 and the average family size was 2.87.

The median age in the city was 43.6 years. 21.4% of residents were under the age of 18; 6.1% were between the ages of 18 and 24; 24.4% were from 25 to 44; 27.6% were from 45 to 64; and 20.5% were 65 years of age or older. The gender makeup of the city was 46.3% male and 53.7% female.

=== 2000 census ===
As of the census of 2000, there were 1,557 people, 686 households, and 447 families living in the city. The population density was 1,093.7 people per square mile (422.3 people/km^{2}). There were 780 housing units at an average density of 547.9 units per square mile (211.5 units/km^{2}). The racial makeup of the city was 91.33% White, 7.13% African American, 0.51% Native American, 0.13% Asian, 0.19% from other races, and 0.71% from two or more races. Hispanic or Latino of any race were 1.16% of the population.

There were 686 households, out of which 28.0% had children under the age of 18 living with them, 47.4% were married couples living together, 14.9% had a female householder with no husband present, and 34.8% were non-families. 31.5% of all households were made up of individuals, and 13.1% had someone living alone who was 65 years of age or older. The average household size was 2.23 and the average family size was 2.77.

In the city, the population was spread out, with 23.8% under the age of 18, 7.5% from 18 to 24, 26.5% from 25 to 44, 25.4% from 45 to 64, and 16.8% who were 65 years of age or older. The median age was 40 years. For every 100 females, there were 90.8 males. For every 100 females age 18 and over, there were 82.6 males.

The median income for a household in the city was $24,400, and the median income for a family was $27,500. Males had a median income of $31,307 versus $20,313 for females. The per capita income for the city was $14,731. About 15.7% of families and 20.9% of the population were below the poverty line, including 30.1% of those under the age of 18 and 12.6% of those 65 and older.

== Theater and drama ==
In the late 1880s, a man was traveling through on the rail and saw a very pretty young woman at the Ronceverte Depot. The incident inspired a song, "The Pretty Girl of Ronceverte", written by Thomas Thackston and set to music by Charles Pratt. The music is on display at the Ronceverte Public Library.

On September 10–19 the Outdoor Amphitheater stages Riders of the Flood, a popular historical drama based on the book by Pocahontas County author W. E. Blackhurst for the Riders of the Flood Outdoor Drama. The play's theme is a demonstration of Ronceverte's importance in the turn of the 20th century, when its St. Lawrence Boom and Lumber Company was the largest softwood mill in the country, and traces of its industry have sculpted Ronceverte's portion of the Greenbrier River to the shape it is today. All proceeds from the play are recycled back into the town of Ronceverte with the intention of improving the community, uplifting its economy, and fostering civic pride. Riders of the Flood is a member of West Virginia's Institute for Outdoor Drama. At this point, it is a purely volunteer program, as is its sequel, Big Dreams, Restless Spirit.

== See also ==
- List of cities in West Virginia
