= Allegheny Mountain (West Virginia–Virginia) =

Mountain in the United States

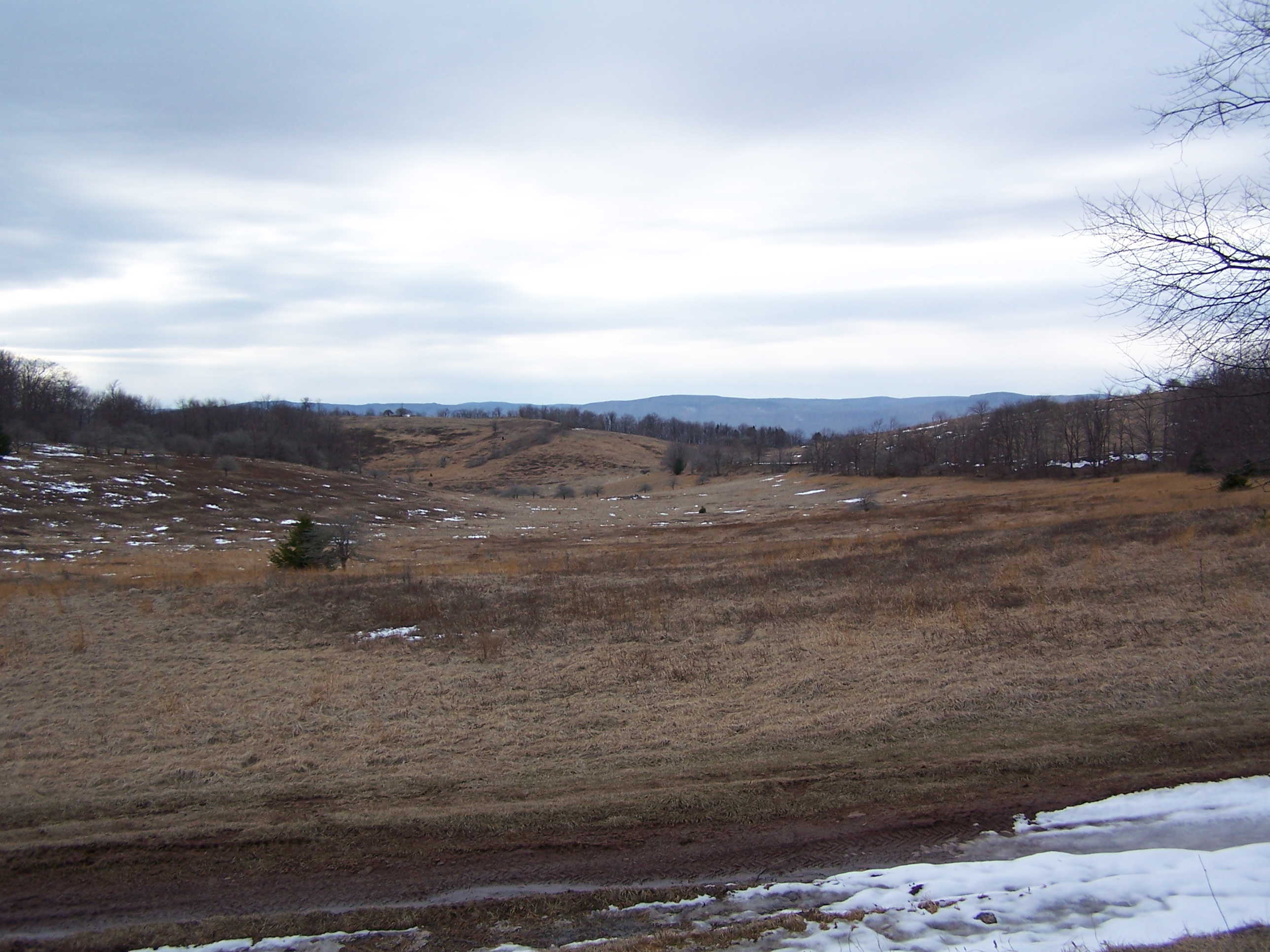
- Camp Allegheny battlefield at Top of Allegheny.

Highest point
- Peak: Paddy Knob, Pocahontas County, WV and Highland County, VA
- Elevation: 4,478 ft (1,365 m)
- Coordinates: 38°15′56″N 79°47′46″W

Geography
- Location within West Virginia
- Location: Tamarack Ridge in Highland County, VA
- Country: United States
- States: Virginia and West Virginia
- Counties: Greenbrier WV, Alleghany VA, Pocahontas WV, Bath VA and Highland VA
- Range coordinates: 38°28′47″N 79°41′37″W
- Parent range: Allegheny Mountains

Allegheny Mountain (spelling as Alleghany Mountain in Virginia) is a major mountain ridge in the southern range of the Allegheny Mountains, part of the Appalachian Mountains. It forms the Eastern Continental Divide along part of its course and also serves as part of the Virginia–West Virginia state line.

Elevations of 4,000 feet (1,200 m) are exceeded along much of Allegheny Mountain.

== Major peaks ==
Listed from southwest to northeast:

- Hickory Knob – 3,309 feet (1,009 m)
- Smith Knob
- Chestnut Knob
- High Top (Lookout Tower)
- Chestnut Levels
- Mad Tom
- Mad Sheep – 4,225 feet (1,288 m)
- Paddy Knob – 4,477 feet (1,365 m)
- Bald Knob
- Watering Pond Knob
- Bear Mountain
- Top of Allegheny (site of Camp Allegheny battlefield)
- Tamarack Ridge
- Grassy Knob

== Principal gaps ==
- Rucker Gap
- Ryder Gap

== See also ==
- Battle of Camp Allegheny
- George Washington National Forest
- Mad Sheep Ridge
- Monongahela National Forest
