= Battle of Carnifex Ferry order of battle =

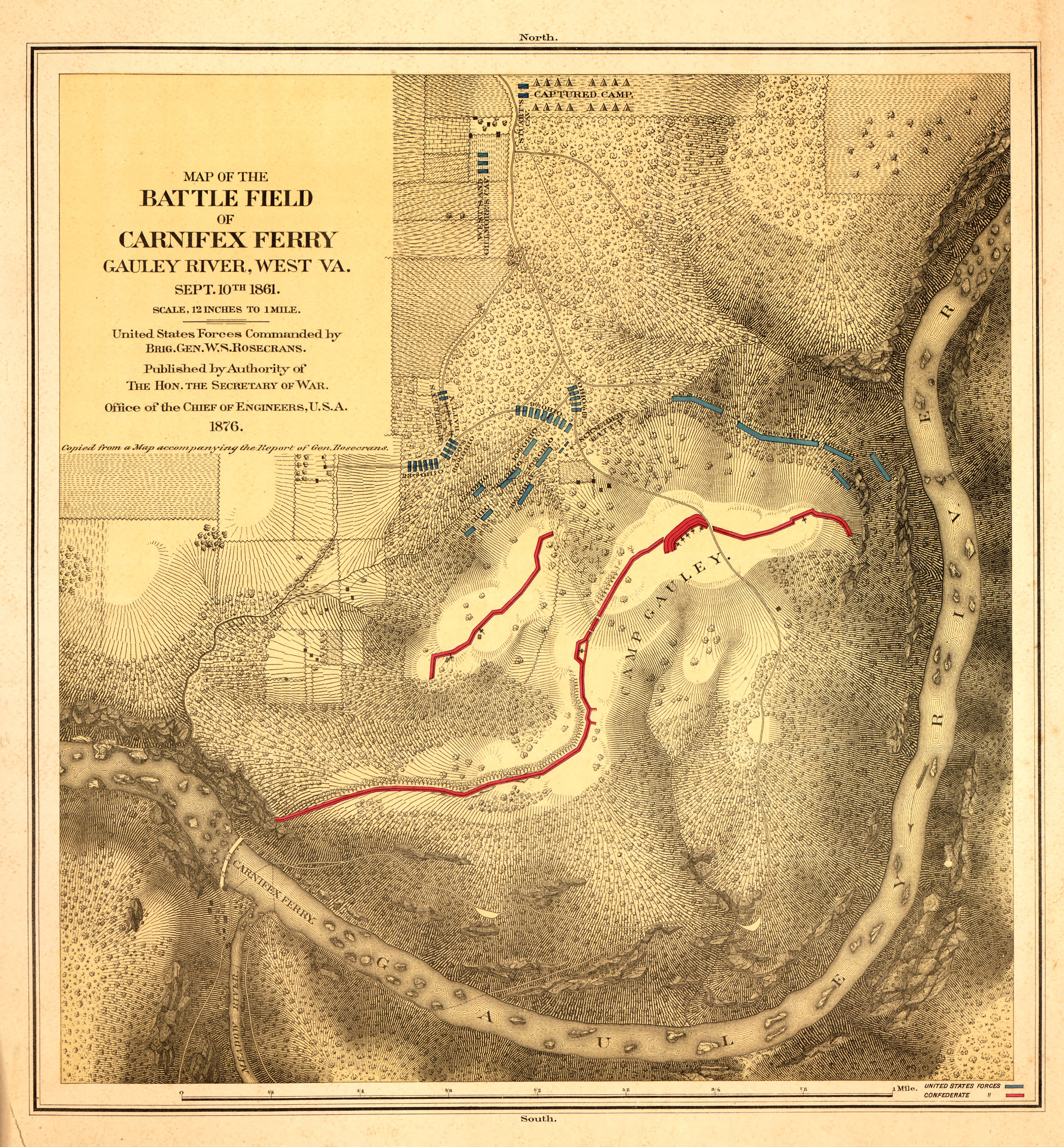
Battlefield map of Carnifex Ferry highlighting the movement of Rosecrans' troops

The following Union Army and Confederate Army units and commanders fought in the Battle of Carnifex Ferry of the American Civil War on September 10, 1861, in Nicholas County, Virginia (now West Virginia).

== Abbreviations used ==
=== Military rank ===
- BG = Brigadier General
- Col = Colonel
- Ltc = Lieutenant Colonel
- Cpt = Captain

=== Other ===
- w = wounded
- k = killed

== Union Forces ==
=== Army of West Virginia ===
BG William S. Rosecrans

Brigade	Unit
1st Brigade BG Henry Washington Benham	10th Ohio: Col William Haines Lytle (w), Ltc Herman J. Korff; 12th Ohio: Col John W. Lowe (k), Ltc Carr B. White; 13th Ohio: Col William Sooy Smith; 1st Ohio Battery: Cpt James Ross McMullen; Schneider's Provisional Battery (2 rifled guns): Cpt William Schneider
2nd Brigade Col Robert Latimer McCook	9th Ohio: Col Charles Sondershoff; 28th Ohio: Col Augustus Moor; 47th Ohio: Col Frederick Poschner; Chicago Dragoons: Cpt Fred Schambeck
3rd Brigade Col Eliakim Parker Scammon (in reserve)	23rd Ohio: Maj Rutherford B. Hayes; 30th Ohio: Col Hugh B. Ewing; Mack's (New York) Battery

== Confederate Forces ==
=== Army of the Kanawha ===
BG John Buchanan Floyd

- 22nd Virginia Infantry Regiment "1st Kanawha Infantry": Col Christopher Q. Tompkins
- 36th Virginia Infantry Regiment "2nd Kanawha Infantry": Col John McCausland
- 45th Virginia Infantry Regiment: Col Henry Heth
- 50th Virginia Infantry Regiment: Col Alexander W. Reynolds
- 51st Virginia Infantry Regiment: Col Gabriel C. Wharton
- 51st Virginia Militia Regiment: Ltc William W. Glass
- Beckett's Cavalry Company: Cpt. Albert J. Beckett
- Corn's Cavalry Company: Cpt. James M. Corn
- Virginia Light Artillery "Gauley Artillery": Cpt. Stephen Adams
- State Volunteer Artillery: Cpt. John H. Guy

== See also ==
- West Virginia in the American Civil War
