= Battle of Charleston (1862) =

Battle in the American Civil War

Coordinates: 38°20′50″N 81°38′00″W

- Part of the American Civil War
- Kanawha County, West Virginia
Date	September 13, 1862
Location	Kanawha County, West Virginia
Result	Confederate victory

Belligerents
United States (Union)	(Confederate States of America) Confederate States

Commanders and leaders
Joseph A. J. Lightburn: Edward Siber; Samuel A. Gilbert	William W. Loring: John McCausland; John S. Williams; Gabriel C. Wharton

Units involved
District of the Kanawha: First Brigade; Second Brigade; Additional troops	Dept. of SW Virginia: First Brigade; Second Brigade; Third Brigade

Strength
~ 5,000	~ 5,000

Casualties and losses
19: 11 killed; 2 wounded; 6 captured/missing	8: 4 killed; 4 wounded; unknown captured/missing

The Battle of Charleston was a Confederate victory in Kanawha County, Virginia, on September 13, 1862, during the American Civil War. Troops led by Major General William W. Loring defeated a Union force led by Colonel Joseph Andrew Jackson Lightburn. This battle, which featured the extensive use of artillery but few casualties, was the second major fight in Loring's Kanawha Valley Campaign of 1862 that succeeded in driving Union forces out of the Kanawha River Valley. All points in the Kanawha River Valley were in the southwestern part of Virginia at the time of the battle, but are now part of the state of West Virginia.

After a victory in the Battle of Fayetteville on September 10, and a pursuit down the Kanawha River, Loring caught Lightburn's force at Charleston during the morning of September 13. Much of the fighting became an artillery duel, especially after Lightburn brought his command to the west side of the Elk River. Once Lightburn burned a bridge across the river, it became difficult for Loring to continue his pursuit. Lightburn retreated to the safety of Ohio, but abandoned the direct route along the Kanawha River to avoid Confederate cavalry waiting for him. He brought 700 wagons of supplies with him.

Loring did not conduct much of a pursuit, and was content to gather supplies in Charleston. His report claimed he captured supplies worth at least $1,000,000 (equivalent to $32,250,000 in 2025), and the nearby salt-mines were saved. He established headquarters in Charleston, and released a declaration urging locals to join him. In less than four weeks, he offended Confederate leadership and was replaced by Brigadier General John Echols. The Union commander in the Kanawha Valley prior to Lightburn was Jacob Dolson Cox. In October, Cox was promoted to major general and returned to the valley. Confederate troops were defeated by November and gone from the valley.

== Background ==
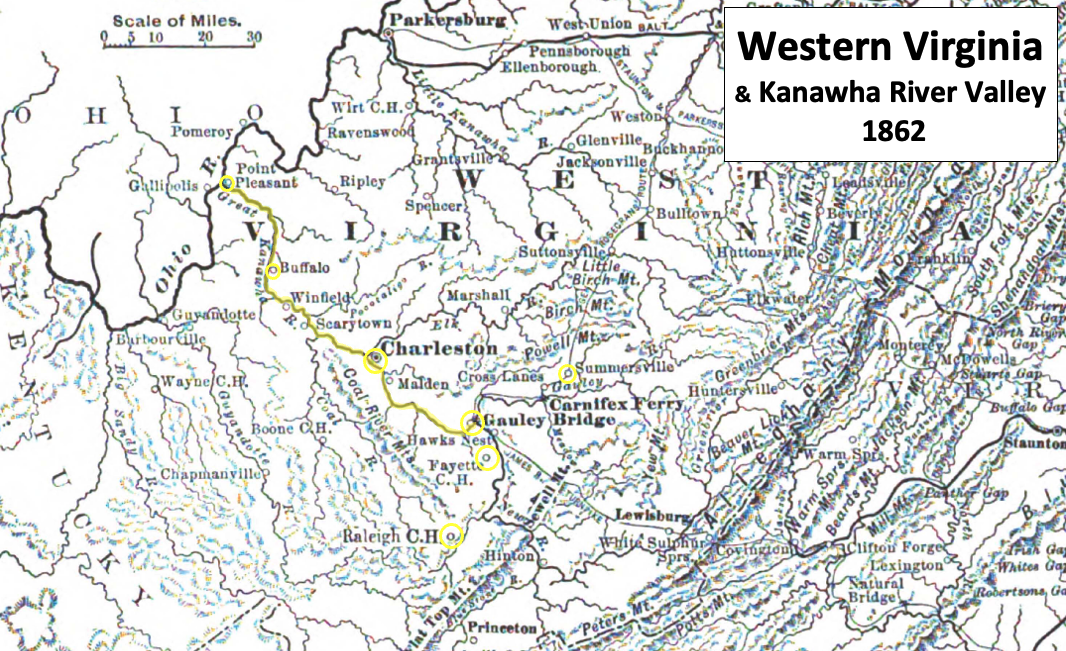
The Kanawha River Valley was important to the Confederacy

In the American Civil War, Union forces controlled a large portion of southwestern Virginia during the summer of 1862. Brigadier General Jacob Dolson Cox was commander of the District of the Kanawha, which included Charleston and southwestern Virginia along the Kanawha River Valley. The western portion of Virginia had few good roads and few settlements. Using small steamboats from the Ohio River, the Kanawha River could be navigated for about 70 miles (110 km) to a point about 10 miles (16 km) upstream from Charleston, which meant the river could be used to transport troops and supplies. Charleston is located where the Elk River joins the Kanawha River.

Further upstream (with non-navigable portions), the Kanawha River is formed by the meeting of the New River and the Gauley River at the community of Gauley Bridge. That community was important not only for its river connections, but also because the James River and Kanawha Turnpike ran through it and was intersected by another road that ran northeast to Summersville and beyond. The Kanawha River Valley portion of Virginia, including Charleston (county seat of Kanawha County), became part of the Union state of West Virginia on June 20, 1863.

On August 14, 1862, Cox began moving his Kanawha Division to Washington as reinforcement for Major General John Pope's Army of Virginia. Exceptions to Cox's orders were about 5,000 troops left behind and put under the command of Colonel Joseph Andrew Jackson Lightburn. Soon after Cox left the Kanawha Valley, Pope's quartermaster was captured along with numerous records, and Confederate leaders learned that Cox had left only 5,000 men in the Kanawha Valley at posts around Gauley Bridge. In the southern half of western Virginia, many of the people from the mountains were pro-Union, while the majority in the large valleys were pro-Confederate. The Kanawha Valley was important to the Confederacy in 1862 because of its salt deposits and its potential for new army recruits. (Note: Salt, an essential part of the diet for humans and livestock, was also used for preserving meat during the time of the American Civil War.) The valley, including Charleston, also contained a large amount of supplies used by Union troops. Major General William W. Loring was ordered to clear the Kanawha Valley of Union soldiers, and then move northeast to form a junction with more Confederate soldiers in the Shenandoah Valley.

== Opposing forces ==
=== Union army ===
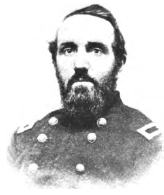
J.A.J. Lightburn

Colonel Joseph Andrew Jackson Lightburn assumed command of the Kanawha District on August 17, 1862. He was very religious and had little combat experience. Under his command were seven infantry regiments and one cavalry regiment. He also had eight mountain howitzers and six artillery pieces—three rifled and three smoothbore. His forces were:

- The First Brigade was commanded by Colonel Edward Siber. It consisted of the 34th and 37th Ohio Infantry regiments. Siber had over 20 years of service as a German soldier in Prussia and Brazil.
- The Second Brigade was commanded by Colonel Samuel A. Gilbert. Gilbert had combat experience, and had fought in the Battle of Cheat Mountain and the Battle of Lewisburg. Under his command were the 44th and 47th Ohio Infantry regiments. Gilbert's brigade also included two companies from the 2nd Loyal Virginia Cavalry Regiment commanded by Major John J. Hoffman. At the time of the battle, four companies from the 4th Loyal Virginia Infantry Regiment and one company from the 9th Loyal Virginia Infantry Regiment had been placed under Gilbert's command.
- Other troops not permanently attached to a brigade were the 2nd Loyal Virginia Cavalry, and the 4th, 8th, and 9th Loyal Virginia infantry regiments. These regiments were often split and scattered throughout the region. Over half of the 2nd Loyal Virginia Cavalry, commanded by Colonel John C. Paxton, was elsewhere during the battle. Two companies, commanded by Major John J. Hoffman, were with Gilbert's Second Brigade. Another two cavalry companies were under the command of the cavalry's Lieutenant Colonel Rollin L. Curtis. (Note: Curtis is identified as a major in Lightburn's September 24 report, but the regimental historian notes that Curtis was promoted to lieutenant colonel and commissioned on August 19.) The 4th Loyal Virginia Infantry was present at the battle and commanded by Lieutenant Colonel William H. H. Russell. There is no evidence the 8th Loyal Virginia Infantry was present for the battle at Charleston. The only casualty known for that regiment, in the entire campaign, occurred in October.

=== Confederate army ===
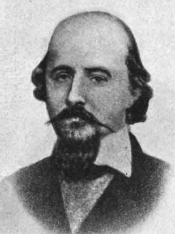
William W. Loring

Major General William W. Loring commanded the Department of Southwestern Virginia. He had been a soldier since the age of 14, was a sergeant at the age of 17, and fought in the Second Seminole War and the Mexican–American War. Under his command were six infantry regiments, three infantry battalions, and batteries.

- The First Brigade was normally commanded by Brigadier General John Echols. It consisted of the 50th and 63rd Virginia Infantry regiments, plus Derrick's 23rd Virginia Infantry Battalion. Echols became ill, so the brigade was commanded by Colonel John McCausland. Added to this brigade were the 22nd and 36th Virginia Infantry regiments. Also part of the brigade were Lowry's Battery, Otey's Battery, and a small portion of cavalry.
- The Second Brigade was commanded by Brigadier General John S. Williams. Under his command were Edgar's Battalion and the 45th Virginia Infantry Regiment. The 22nd Virginia Infantry Regiment was detached to the First Brigade. His artillery (six pieces) was led by Major John Floyd King.
- The Third Brigade was commanded by Colonel Gabriel C. Wharton. In the battle of Charleston, the brigade united and cooperated with the Second Brigade commanded by Brigadier General Williams. The brigade consisted of the 51st Virginia Infantry Regiment and 30th Virginia Sharpshooters Battalion (a.k.a. Clarke's Battalion of Sharpshooters).

== Movement to battle ==
=== Cavalry raid ===
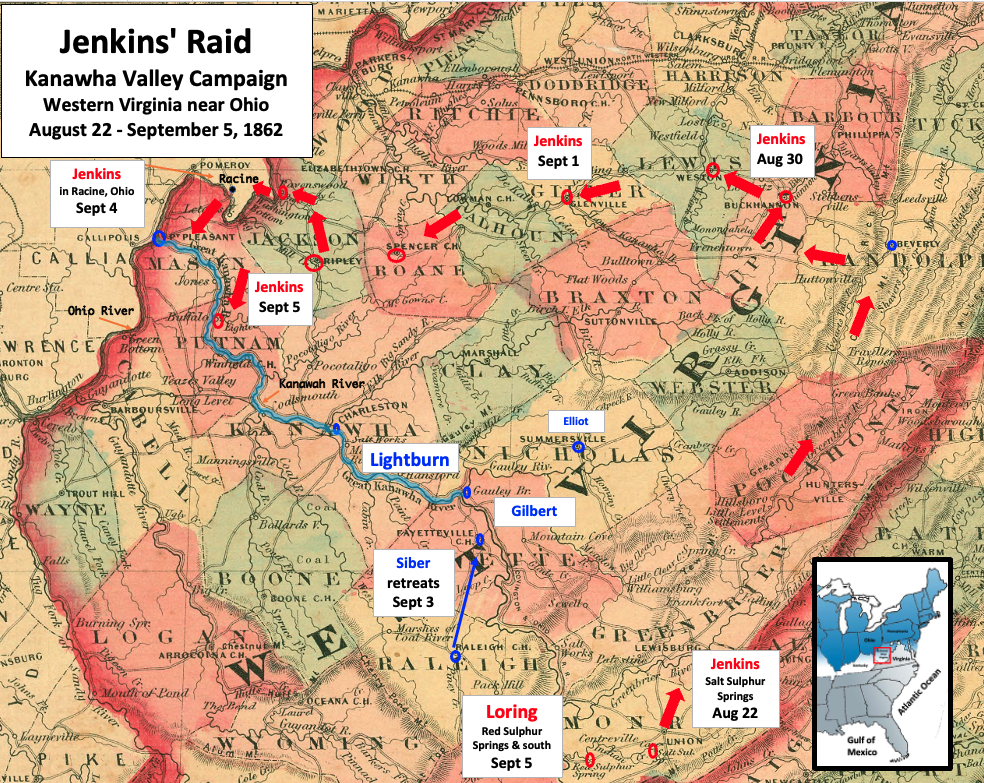
Loring planned to attack the Union force after Jenkins circled behind and cut off the main Union path for retreat.

Confederate Major General Loring planned to take control of the Kanawha River Valley by leading a large force in an assault on Union forces located in Raleigh, Fayette, and Kanawha counties. As early as August 31, Union leaders had received reports that Loring had a force of 10,000 troops. Loring's force actually consisted of about 5,000 men instead of the rumored 10,000, but he expected to add to it by recruiting and organizing existing local militias. (Note: One author (Francis Lightburn Cressman) claims that Loring reported a force of only 5,000 men, which was lower than its actual size, to downplay his numerical advantage and make his victories appear as difficult accomplishments.)

Part of Loring's plan was sending a cavalry force through 500 miles (800 km) of Union–controlled territory to cut off the most direct Union route of retreat downriver. The cavalry force was led by Brigadier General Albert G. Jenkins and consisted of about 550 men. On August 22, Jenkins started north from Salt Sulphur Springs. He captured a Union supply depot on August 30, and was able to resupply his poorly-armed men.

News of Jenkins reached Union Colonel Lightburn, who was headquartered at Gauley Bridge. He sent orders to concentrate his forces, and the Union outpost at Raleigh Court House was abandoned on September 3. Union Colonel Edward Siber moved his brigade north from Raleigh Court House to Fayette Court House. By September 5, Jenkins was at the small town of Buffalo located on the Kanawha River between Charleston and the Ohio River. His mission was accomplished, and Union forces upriver were not where he would go next. On the next day, Loring's brigades began moving north from their camps near Red Sulphur Springs, Grey Sulphur Springs, and the Narrows of New River.

=== Fayetteville ===
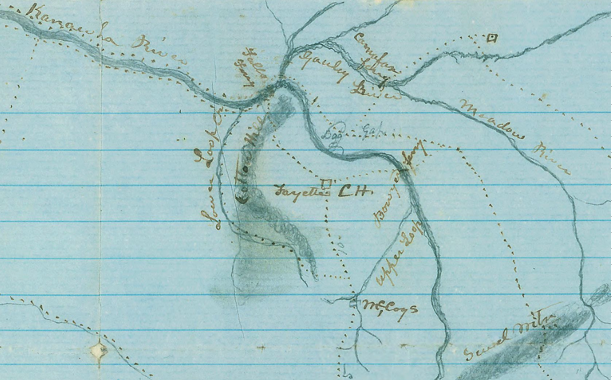
Loring's map for Fayetteville ("Fayette C.H." in center) and Gauley Bridge

Loring moved through Princeton, Flat Top Mountain, and on to Raleigh Court House. Arriving at the Union fortification at Raleigh Court House (today's Beckley) on September 9, he discovered Union troops had evacuated. He attacked the Union front and right flank at Fayette Court House (a.k.a. Fayetteville) on September 10, and fierce fighting occurred all day. Between 1:00 and 2:00 am on September 11, Union Colonel Edward Siber's brigade quietly abandoned the Union outpost at Fayette Court House and moved north.

Lightburn believed his entire force would need to retreat, and their probable destination was Point Pleasant on the Ohio River at the mouth of the Kanawha River. Union forces not located at Fayetteville, including at Summersville and Gauley Bridge, prepared to retreat. The Union commander at Fayetteville, Colonel Siber, led a fighting retreat, with the largest skirmishes occurring at Cotton Hill and Montgomery Ferry between Fayetteville and the Kanawha River. Elements of Lightburn's other brigade, commanded by Colonel Samuel Gilbert, provided artillery protection from the north side of the river. Union troops on both sides of the river (Siber on the south side, Gilbert on the north) continued retreating down the Kanawha River with the Confederates pursuing.

=== Charleston ===
On September 12, Lightburn waited at Union Camp Piatt. The camp was located on the Kanawha River about 13 miles (21 km) upriver (east) from Charleston. Siber's brigade crossed the Kanawha River near the camp, and Lightburn's command was reunited. Lightburn believed about 8,000 Confederates were in the valley. He knew he was being pursued by Loring, and thought Confederate cavalry was waiting downriver from Charleston to cut off the Union retreat. Just after midnight (September 13 am), Lightburn's men began moving downriver to Charleston. The town's population for 1861 was about 1,500, and it was located on the Kanawha River and a major road known as the James River and Kanawha Turnpike. On the downriver (west) side of town, the Elk River empties into the Kanawha River, and travelers on the turnpike must cross the Elk River on a suspension bridge. Many of Lightburn's troops took a defensive position on the downriver side of the Elk River, while the remaining troops took forward positions on the east side. Lightburn urged locals to evacuate the town.

== Battle ==
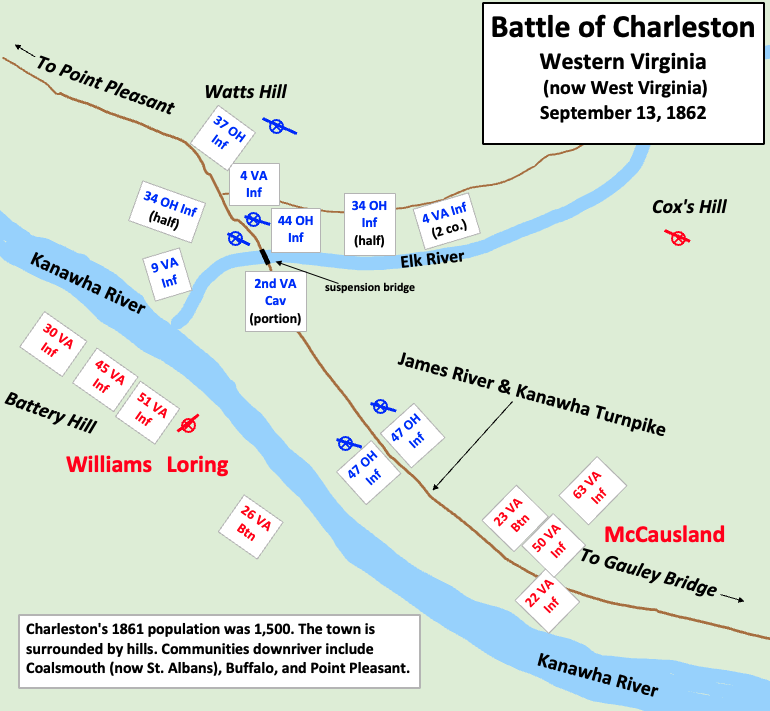
Union troops eventually destroyed the bridge across the Elk River to escape the pursuing Confederate army

Lightburn's force east of the Elk River consisted of a portion of the 47th Ohio Infantry aided by three mountain howitzers, and a small detachment of the 2nd Loyal Virginia Cavalry. This group was led by Colonel Lyman S. Elliott, and its first (eastmost) position was near a large home known as Rosedale. Elliott's pickets east of town began being driven back a few minutes before 9:30 am. Loring's pursuing Confederate troops were led on the north side of the Kanawha River by Colonel John McCausland. He deployed the 23rd Virginia Infantry Battalion in front as skirmishers. McCausland's main battle line consisted of the 63rd Virginia Infantry Regiment on his right, the 50th Virginia Infantry Regiment in the center, and the 22nd Virginia Infantry Regiment on the left. The 36th Virginia Infantry Regiment, artillery, and some cavalry were originally kept in reserve.

Loring's force on the south side of the Kanawha River was led by Brigadier General John S. Williams, and he mostly made use of his artillery, the 30th Battalion Virginia Sharpshooters, and the 45th Virginia Infantry. While McCausland was driving back Union pickets, Union infantry tried to cross the Kanawha River and attack Williams, but this was quickly repulsed.

As the fighting escalated, Colonel Gilbert made the Union troop placements, while Colonel Siber positioned the artillery. Confederate artillery fire from both sides of the Kanawha River caused the 47th Ohio to fall back into the middle of town, while Union artillery returned fire. The new Union front line had one company of the 47th Ohio facing the Kanawha River while the remaining portion of the line extended across the streets of the town and ended near the Elk River. At about 1:00 pm, Lightburn realized the Confederates were getting closer, and he gave orders to burn all government buildings containing supplies that could not be removed. By 1:30 pm, both sides were making heavy use of their artillery—and buildings were burning. Union wagons were already moving away from town. At 2:00 pm the 47th Ohio was surrounded on three sides, and Gilbert brought them away from town across the Elk River bridge. The regiment's Lieutenant Colonel Augustus Parry was involved with the destruction of the Elk River bridge. The bridge was destroyed by setting it on fire and cutting its cables. Any pursuit by McCausland became much more difficult.

Although the destruction of the Elk River bridge formed a barrier between Lightburn and McCausland, an artillery duel continued until 10:00 pm. Lightburn's wagon train stopped moving around 3:00 pm—and prevented the army's retreat because it blocked the road. Colonel Gilbert rode to the front of the train and discovered the cause of the stoppage was overloaded wagons and its quartermaster fearing the enemy was in their front. He solved the problem by having Colonel Elliott take control, and Elliott was eventually able to get the wagon train moving. Among the wagons were local families and African Americans who also sought to flee Confederate troops.

== Retreat ==
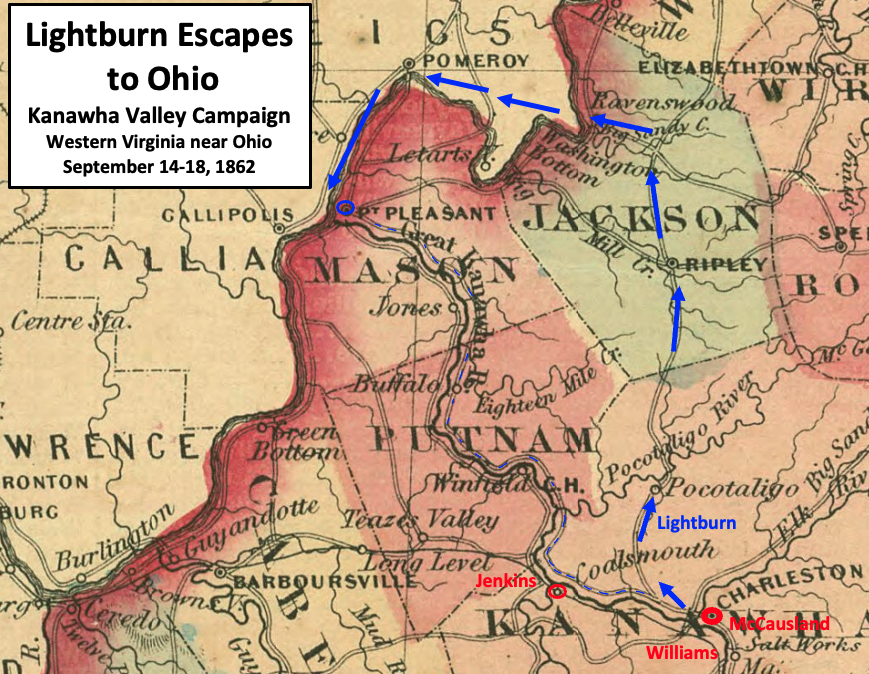
Lightburn escaped from the pursuing Confederate forces using the road to Ripley instead of the direct route to Point Pleasant

Lightburn chose to have his supply wagons move northwest down the Ripley Road—not the road along the Kanawha River that ran directly to Point Pleasant. The longer route enabled his force to avoid a possible confrontation with Confederate cavalry (either John B. Floyd or Jenkins) believed to be where the Coal River emptied into the Kanawha River (a.k.a. Coalsmouth). In addition, the route along the Kanawha River would continuously be within the range of William's artillery that could still advance along the south side of the river. Lightburn continued north toward Ripley until he reached Sissonville (Pocatalico), where he camped for the night. The battle was over and Loring possessed Charleston.

On September 14, the Confederates constructed a pontoon bridge over the Elk River and camped on the other side. The pursuit was soon abandoned, since they had left their supply trains behind earlier in their effort to catch the Union army as it retreated from Fayetteville and Gauley Bridge. Loring's report also said the enemy was getting close to the Ohio River, making it "useless to pursue him farther". Loring's main force settled in at Charleston, and began taking inventory of captured supplies.

Lightburn's men continued their retreat. On September 15, portions of Lightburn's command reached Ripley. On the next day, Union troops moved from Ripley to Ravenswood and began crossing the Ohio River. The 4th Loyal Virginia with the artillery boarded barges destined for Point Pleasant. Other troops crossed the river on steamboats and barges, and began marching to Point Pleasant on the Ohio side of the river. Lightburn's entire Union army did not reach Point Pleasant until the evening of September 18. The retreat later became known as "Lightburn's Retreat". (Note: Private Joseph J. Sutton, of the 2nd West Virginia Cavalry, describes the event in a chapter from his regimental history called "Lightburn's Retreat". The surgeon for the 4th Loyal Virginia Infantry, Dr. Thomas H. Barton, uses the label "Lightburn's Retreat" in the table of contents for his autobiography. Historian Terry Lowry has a chapter in one of his books that begins with the title "Lightburn's Retreat", and implies the retreat began after the Battle of Fayetteville.)

== Aftermath ==
Loring was content to remain in Charleston, and issued a proclamation on September 14 urging the local population to join him. He had achieved his objective—driving the Union army out of the Kanawha Valley. On September 19, western Virginia was attached to the command of Union Major General Horatio G. Wright, who was headquartered in Cincinnati. Wright ordered Brigadier General Quincy Adams Gillmore to take command at Point Pleasant on September 27, but then changed his mind and sent Brigadier General Robert H. Milroy. In early October, Cox was promoted to major general and sent back to Point Pleasant as commander of western Virginia.

Loring remained in Charleston until October 9, when he began moving his army upriver. Loring had become argumentative and uncooperative with Confederate leadership, so he was replaced by Brigadier General John Echols in mid-October. By October 28, Echols was moving east as the Union army advanced up the Kanawha River. On the afternoon of October 30, Cox moved his army across the Elk River into Charleston. By November 2, a division of Union troops was at Gauley Bridge, and inspections were being conducted at Fayetteville and Raleigh Court House. On November 8, Union leadership determined no posts needed to be established beyond Gauley Bridge.

=== Casualties ===
Exact numbers for the Union casualties are difficult to tabulate, since Union reporting is for the entire campaign instead of only the Battle of Charleston. Lightburn's official report for the entire campaign said 25 killed, 95 wounded, and 190 missing. Siber's brigade did most of its fighting at the Fayetteville portion of the campaign. Although Siber does not have a detailed list of casualties, he mentions he had "more than 80" wounded at Fayetteville. Gilbert's campaign report lists nine killed, eight wounded, and 78 missing—although he expected the number of missing to decrease. One historian has attempted to tabulate casualties using newspaper reports, pension records, regimental histories, and correspondence. Based on his research, Union casualties at Charleston totaled to only eleven killed, two wounded, and six missing or captured. This count is only for events that happened at Charleston on September 13, 1862. Twelve of the nineteen casualties involved the 4th Loyal Virginia Infantry or the 47th Ohio Infantry. Loring, discussing Union casualties in his September 15 report, said "Four were left dead in Charleston and 5 wounded". He also claimed "Their loss west of Elk River, opposite Charleston, where they met with heavy loss, could not be ascertained...."

For the Confederacy, Loring's Medical Director, John A. Hunter, listed 18 killed and 89 wounded for the entire campaign. Loring's September 13 report claimed they captured Charleston "after a stout resistance from the enemy, in which their loss was heavy, ours was very slight." His September 15 report says Confederate casualties were "[S]ix killed at Charleston and 8 slightly wounded....". Using methods similar to those used to research Union casualties, one historian found evidence of only four Confederates killed and four wounded at Charleston.

=== Performance ===
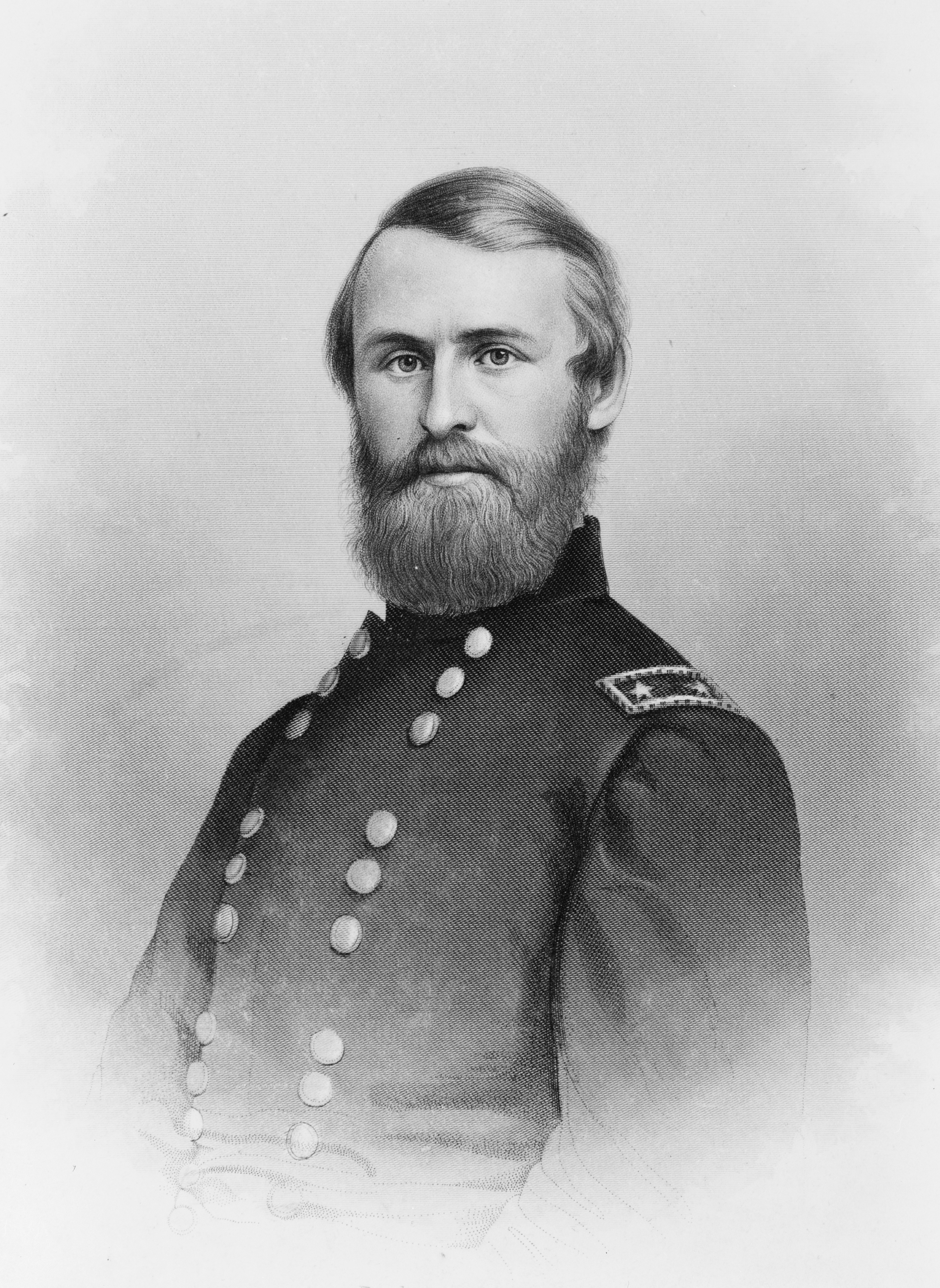
Jacob Cox

Initial newspaper reports were positive concerning Lightburn's decision to retreat. The Cleveland Morning Leader said, "The retreat was undoubtedly a masterly movement, and does great credit to Colonel Lightburn." Lightburn reported he brought back over 700 wagons. However, he also reported he had to burn "a large amount of stores" to prevent them from being possessed by the enemy. Loring's report claimed Lightburn destroyed "several millions of dollars" in supplies, but he (Loring) was able to capture supplies worth at least $1,000,000 (equivalent to $32,250,000 in 2025). He also noted in an earlier report the nearby "salt-works" was saved.

Some soldiers had a negative perspective for the battle and retreat. Cox later implied the Battle of Charleston should not have been fought, writing "...either of the brigades intrenched at Gauley Bridge could have laughed at Loring. The river would have been impassable, for all the ferry-boats were in the keeping of our men on the right bank, and Loring would not dare pass down the valley leaving a fortified post on the line of communications by which he must return." A lieutenant colonel from the 4th West Virginia Infantry, who was a captain in the 4th Loyal Virginia Infantry during the campaign, wrote Lightburn's retreat was "disastrous and demoralizing". He believed Loring could have been stopped at Fayetteville or Gauley if Union troops had been concentrated at those places—also implying the Battle of Charleston could have been avoided.

=== Preservation ===
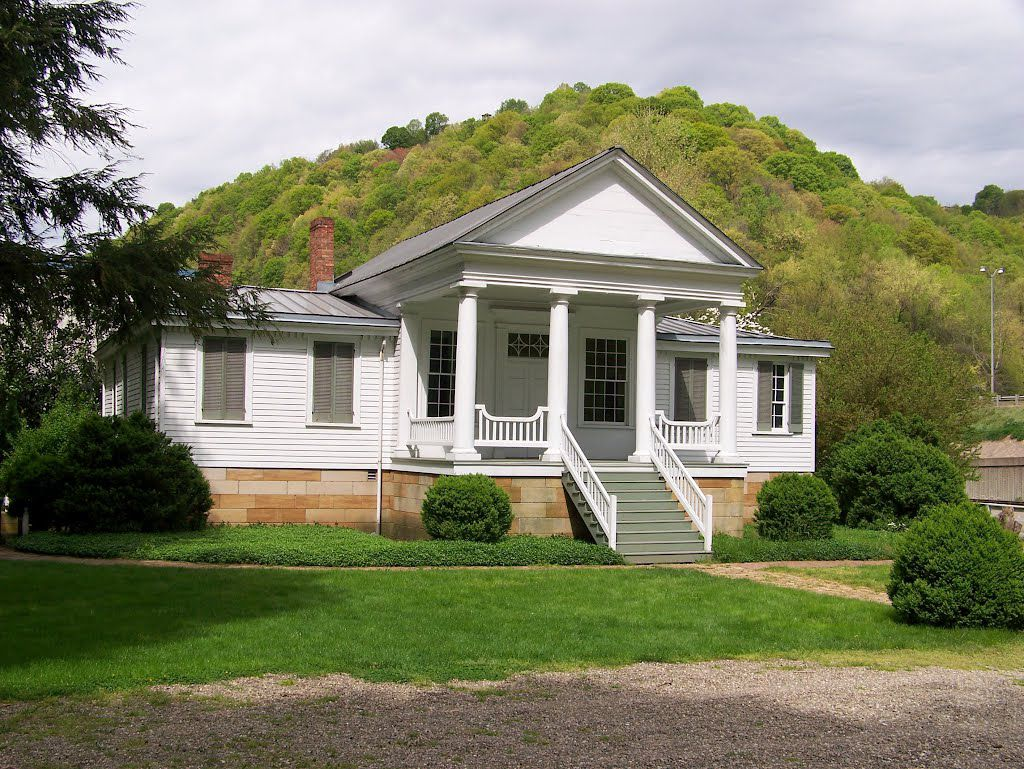
Former home of George S. Patton Sr. in 2012

The battlefield at Charleston is now covered by a modern town. Some events and places are memorialized with historical markers. Not far from Charleston is a historical marker for Camp Piatt, near Belle, West Virginia, posted by the West Virginia Department of Culture and History. In Charleston, the restored Ruffner Log House (a.k.a. Rosedale), used by Lightburn as headquarters, has been moved to a new location adjacent to the Craik-Patton House. Colonel George S. Patton Sr., commander of the 22nd Virginia Infantry Regiment that fought at Charleston and grandfather of World War II General George S. Patton, owned what is now called the Craik–Patton house when he was an attorney prior to the American Civil War.

Two historical markers commemorate the invasion of Ohio by Jenkins that was a byproduct of Jenkins being sent to a position between Lightburn and Ohio. In West Virginia, a highway marker titled "Ohio River Ford" marks the spot at Ravenswood where Jenkins crossed into Ohio. On the Ohio side, a historical marker titled "First Ohio Invasion" discusses the invasion, and is placed at Buffington Island north of the actual crossing point. A historical marker in Gallipolis, Ohio, (indirectly across the Ohio River from Point Pleasant) commemorates the African Methodist Episcopal Church, and it mentions it was a place of refuge for soldiers "during the time of Lightburn's Retreat".

== See also ==
- List of West Virginia Civil War Confederate units
- List of West Virginia Civil War Union units
- West Virginia in the Civil War

== Notes ==
=== References ===
- Barton, Thomas H. (1890). Autobiography of Dr. Thomas H. Barton, Including a History of the Fourth Regt. West Va. Vol. Inf'y, with an Account of Col. Lightburn's retreat down the Kanawha Valley... Charleston, West Virginia: West Virginia Printing Co. OCLC 468804204. Archived from the original on 2023-03-18.
- Cox, Jacob Dolson (1900). Military Reminiscences of the Civil War Volume I - April 1861-November 1863. New York, New York: Charles Scribner's Sons. ISBN 978-3-84951-384-9. Archived from the original on 2023-02-10.
- Evans, Clement A., ed. (1899). Confederate Military History: A library of Confederate States History.... (Volume II). Atlanta, Georgia: Confederate Publishing Company. OCLC 951143. Archived from the original on 2022-05-26.
- Lowry, Terry (2016). The Battle of Charleston and the 1862 Kanawha Valley campaign. Charleston, West Virginia: 35th Star Publishing. ISBN 978-0-96645-348-5. OCLC 981250860.
- MacCorkle, William Alexander (1916). The White Sulphur Springs; the Traditions, History, and Social Life of the Greenbriar White Sulphur Springs. Charleston, West Virginia: W.A. MacCorkle. OCLC 11083303.
- Scott, Robert N., ed. (1885). The War of the Rebellion: a Compilation of the Official Records of the Union and Confederate Armies Series I Volume XII Part II. Washington, DC: Government Printing Office. OCLC 427057. Archived from the original on May 31, 2022.
- Scott, Robert N., ed. (1887). The War of the Rebellion: a Compilation of the Official Records of the Union and Confederate Armies Series I Volume XIX Part I. Washington, DC: Government Printing Office. OCLC 427057. Archived from the original on May 23, 2022.
- Snell, Mark A. (2012). West Virginia and the Civil War : Mountaineers are Always Free. Charleston, SC: History Press. ISBN 978-1-61423-390-9. OCLC 1051048067.
- Starr, Stephen Z. (1981). Union Cavalry in the Civil War Volume II – The War in the East from Gettysburg to Appomattox 1863–1865. Baton Rouge, Louisiana: Louisiana State University Press. OCLC 4492585.
- Sutton, Joseph J. (2001) [1892]. History of the Second Regiment, West Virginia Cavalry Volunteers, During the War of the Rebellion. Huntington, WV: Blue Acorn Press. ISBN 978-0-9628866-5-2. OCLC 263148491.
- Vance, John L. (1896). "The Retreat of the Union Forces from the Kanawha Valley in 1862". In Chamberlin, William Henry (ed.). Sketches of war history, 1861–1865 : Papers Read Before the Ohio Commandery of the Military Order of the Loyal Legion of the United States. Cincinnati, Ohio: The Robert Clarke Company. pp. 118–132. OCLC 191708365. Archived from the original on March 23, 2023.
