= 45th Virginia Infantry Regiment =

- Flag of Virginia, 1861
- Active: May 1861 – Spring 1865
- Disbanded: 1865
- Country: Confederacy
- Allegiance: Confederate States of America
- Branch: Confederate States Army
- Type: Infantry
- Engagements: American Civil War: Battle of Carnifex Ferry; Battle of Giles Court House; Battle of Lewisburg; Battle of Fayetteville (1862 Western Virginia); Battle of Charleston; Battle of White Sulphur Springs; Battle of Blountville; Battle of Cloyd's Mountain; Battle of Piedmont; Battle of Lynchburg; Battle of Monocacy; Battle of Fort Stevens; Battle of Heaton's Crossroads; Battle of Cool Spring; Battle of Kernstown II; Battle of Berryville; Battle of Opequon; Battle of Fisher's Hill; Battle of Hupp's Hill; Battle of Cedar Creek; Battle of Waynesboro, Virginia

Commanders
- Notable commanders: Colonel Henry Heth; Lt. Colonel William Elisha Peters; Colonel William Henry Browne; Maj. Francis Miller

The 45th Virginia Infantry Regiment was an infantry regiment raised in the Commonwealth of Virginia for service in the Confederate States Army during the American Civil War. It fought mostly in the mountainous area that today encompasses the border regions of Virginia and West Virginia, and was part of Jubal Early's Army of the Valley during the Valley Campaigns of 1864.

== Companies and formation ==
Companies of militia in southwest Virginia began to form as soon as secession occurred on April 17, 1861. Ex-governor John B. Floyd was made a brigadier general and asked to organize these militia into a fighting force. Floyd called the militia to assemble at the central railroad hub of Wytheville and appointed West Point graduate Henry Heth to drill and organize the volunteers.

By May 29, Heth had formed ten companies of roughly 900 men into a fighting unit and it was mustered in as the 45th Virginia.

The original ten companies were:

1. Company A – Floyd Guard (Tazewell Co.), under Captain Joseph Harrison
2. Company B – Mount Airy Rough and Readys (Wythe Co.), under Captain John Buchanan
3. Company C – Grayson Rifles (Grayson Co.), under Captain Alexander M. Davis
4. Company D – Minute Men (Wythe Co.), under Captain Robert H. Gleaves
5. Company E – Rough and Readys (Carroll Co.), under Captain William Lundy
6. Company F – Sharpshooters (Bland Co.), under Captain Andrew J. Grayson
7. Company G – West Augusta Rifles (Tazewell Co.), under Captain William H. Browne
8. Company H – Tazewell Rangers (Tazewell Co.), under Captain Edwin H. Harman
9. Company I – Reed Island Rifles (Carroll Co.), under Captain Thomas D. Bolt
10. Company K – Tazewell Boys (Tazewell Co.), under Captain Titus V. Williams

On June 17, Heth was promoted to colonel and made commander of the regiment. Born in Tidewater Virginia, Heth was unpopular with the mountain farmers and was known as a strict disciplinarian. In turn, Heth was frustrated by the illiteracy and lack of discipline of his men, as well as General Floyd's actions as commanding officer. He wrote of Floyd, "I soon discovered that my chief was as incapacitated for the work he had undertaken as I would have been to lead an Italian opera."

The regiment also elected Gabriel Colvin Wharton, a Virginia Military Institute graduate from Culpeper as major, but within a month he was made a colonel, in command of the 51st Virginia Infantry.

== Western Virginia Campaign of 1861 ==
In August, Floyd decided to move his brigade (the 45th Virginia and the 50th Virginia) into the Kanawha Valley in present-day West Virginia, possibly because of the recent retreat of his political rival, former governor and Confederate brigadier general Henry A. Wise from the same territory. Throughout the month he moved his two regiments north slowly, until they were eventually joined by two more from Wise's brigade, the 22nd and 36th Virginia.

On August 25, scouts reported the 7th Ohio Infantry in camp at Cross Lanes and Floyd, after asking Heth's advice, ordered an attack. The 45th Virginia lost its first man killed in battle, but the brigade easily routed the Ohio soldiers. Floyd made camp at Carnifex Ferry and remained there until September 10, when a Union brigade under Brig. Gen. William S. Rosecrans arrived and drove off Floyd's brigade in the Battle of Carnifex Ferry. During the battle, Floyd was wounded in the arm and treated by a surgeon of the regiment. The 45th Virginia lost no men in the battle, but suffered three casualties while retreating towards Dogwood Gap.

Floyd and Wise met up at Dogwood Gap and together withdrew to Sewell Mountain in Fayette County, where the 45th Virginia received a new company out of Tazewell County, Company L. Floyd decided to fall back about 40 miles southeast to what he believed was a more defensible position and ordered Wise to do so as well, but Wise refused and mocked Floyd as he had been mocked in August. On September 21, Gen. Robert E. Lee arrived at the orders of President Jefferson Davis to take command of forces in the Kanawha Valley region. Lee determined that Wise had been correct, and ordered Floyd's brigade back to Sewell Mountain, but also unified the command under Floyd and sent Wise to Richmond for assignment.

Throughout September and October, the brigade maneuvered around the area in several abortive attempts at an attack on Rosecrans' retreating men. Lee was recalled east October 30, leaving sole command to Floyd, who was becoming more unpopular. Several officers of the 45th Virginia resigned over harsh treatment of their men, and Floyd angrily replaced them, including Captains Joseph Harrison, Alexander Davis, and George Gose. In November, Floyd began shelling Rosecrans' position, but did not order an attack and, when Rosecrans began an offensive of his own on November 10 was forced to retreat on roads made miserable by bad weather. He retreated all the way to Dublin in by December 9 before halting and entering winter quarters.

In December, the 45th Virginia became part of a new brigade that was placed under Heth, who was based in Lewisburg and Lt. Col. William E. Peters took charge of the regiment. January was the end of the regiment's enlistment, and the men were promised $500 and a chance to elect new officers if they signed on for another three-year term. Despite only suffering 4 killed in battle and 70 killed by disease, there was much less enthusiasm than in the previous year.

== Campaigns of 1862 ==
In January, most of the regiment re-enlisted, and Company L was transferred to the 23rd Virginia Infantry. Floyd and most of his command was transferred to Tennessee to support the activities of Gen. Albert Sidney Johnston, and the 45th Virginia spent the next several months maneuvering. In April, Lee, now special military adviser to the President, ordered the regiment to Knoxville, but Brig. Gen. Heth convinced him that it was more vital to guard rail lines in southwest Virginia.

On April 30, the 45th Virginia was asked to quickly counter Union movements by Brig. Gen. Jacob D. Cox in Giles County. On May 10, Heth led a small brigade, including the 45th Virginia, against the 23rd Ohio, now under the command of Lt. Col. Rutherford B. Hayes at Giles Court House, driving them out of their position. Heth praised the leadership of Peters, but when the regiment was finally reorganized four days later, Peters was not elected and left the regiment.

Tazewell native William Browne, a West Point graduate and commander of Company G, was elected colonel, and another Tazewell native, Edwin Houston Harman, was elected lieutenant colonel. Alexander Davis became the new major, and the men also took the opportunity to replace five of the ten company commanders, plus the two who had been promoted, as well as many of the lieutenants.

Heth received word that Col. George Crook had occupied Lewisburg and took the 45th and 22nd Virginia and Finney's Battalion to drive them off. Heth mismanaged his affair, and Crook easily defeated the attack, with only the 45th Virginia maintaining some order. He spent the rest of the summer withdrawing, much to the anger of local residents, until he was transferred to Tennessee and replaced by Brig. Gen. John Echols, a Virginia Military Institute graduate.

Maj. Gen. William W. Loring, who had command of the Department of Southwestern Virginia that the 45th Virginia was operating within, decided to unite his forces in order to drive the Union troops from the Kanawha Valley. At 5 am on September 10, Loring deployed his forces on the approach to the Union camp at Fayetteville, with the 45th Virginia on the left reassigned to the brigade of Brig. Gen. John S. Williams. They advanced through heavy fire, Browne writing, “the enemy threw grape and minie-balls thick as hail around us,” until nightfall stopped the brigade. The Union withdrew during the night and began a nearly week-long pursuit to Charleston. The Confederates reached the city in the midst of a Union retreat. Lt. James Hackler and three other men from Company C crossed the river while the town was still half-occupied and hauled down the garrison’s colors, returning with them over the river safely.

With the conclusion of the Battle of Charleston, Loring had effectively cleared all Union troops from the Kanawha Valley and issued a proclamation saying, "The army of the Confederate states has come upon you to expel the enemy, to rescue the people from despotism of the counterfeit State government imposed on you by Northern bayonets, and to restore the country once more to its natural allegiance to the State." Loring also called on the western counties to cease all cooperation with the Northern armies and to send men for new regiments for his own.

The occupation of Charleston was short-lived, though. Lee's defeat at the Battle of Antietam led him to order Loring to the Shenandoah Valley to reinforce him in case Maj. Gen. George B. McClellan pursued the Army of Northern Virginia across the Potomac River. Loring chose to remain in Charleston instead and was summoned to Richmond, where he began marching with his entire army. On October 16, he was summoned again, but this time was also relieved of command, with Echols replacing him temporarily. Echols tried to move the army back to Charleston, but Union forces had already made the position untenable, so he placed the army into winter quarters on a line from Lewisburg to Princeton.

In November, the 45th Virginia's brigade commander, John S. Williams, was made the new head of the Department of Southwestern Virginia to replace Loring, and it was subordinated to the new Trans-Allegheny Department covering all of western Virginia to the Kentucky border, which Williams also commanded temporarily, until Davis settled on Maj. Gen. Samuel Jones.

== 1863: Defending the Railroad and the Salt Mines ==
By the winter of 1863, the salt mines of Saltville, Virginia, had become of vital importance to Confederate forces in Virginia. Most of the salt used in preserving meat for the armies came from southwestern Virginia and the Department of the Trans-Allegheny generally, and the 45th Virginia specifically, were charged with protecting the supply. Throughout the winter, the regiment engaged in a series of periodic maneuvers designed to support an offensive that never occurred. Mostly, the regiment moved from town to town, even taking the time to rebuild the home of a local man whose house was destroyed by a windstorm.

Summer brought the admission of the state of West Virginia into the Union, as well as Brig. Gen. William W. Averell to southwestern Virginia and a renewed Union offensive. Averell launched another offensive towards Lewisburg and the Confederate government became concerned about the law library containing the deeds to all the land in western counties of Virginia, recently declared as a new state of West Virginia. Troops from the Trans-Allegheny Department, now under Maj. Gen. Samuel Jones, were asked to protect Lewisburg.

A brigade under Col. William L. Jackson attempted to slow Averell and the 45th Virginia, camped in Lewisburg, attempted to come up on his rear. When Jackson was forced to fall back, Jones sent the 22nd Virginia under Col. George S. Patton and the 26th Virginia Battalion and together, with a handful of other troops, they confronted Averell at White Sulphur Springs on August 26. Two companies detached from the 45th Virginia under Lt. Col. Harman entered the fight on the left "fighting like demons," in his words. As Averell added troops against them Col. Browne sent companies to reinforce and, finally, Maj. Davis brought the rest of the regiment.

After Averell's troops had made four charges on his men, Harman wrote:

After they had charged our regt four different times – and had been repulsed – the next time they came through the brush and go up to within 20 paces before we saw them – and the officers hollowed to us – damn you – aint you Rebels going to run – one of my fellows – replied – no damn you we aint and then we give them such a terrific fire they could not withstand it and ran themselves. Our regt repulsed eight heavy and furious charges.

The fighting continued until nightfall, when both armies slept on the field. The next morning, Averell ordered one more charge and was again repulsed. For their stand at White Sulphur Springs, the men of the 45th Virginia won praise from Jones, who wrote in his report that they had "inscribed their names high on the roll of those who in this war have illustrated the valor of our troops." Col Browne also commented that "notwithstanding long marches my men had made (having marched about 100 miles during the four days preceding this engagement), I had no stragglers or skulkers. I have never on any battle-field seen men act cooler or braver; they fought with a determination to do or die."

With the Confederate forces in Tennessee under heavy pressure as the Union approached Chickamauga during September, the 45th Virginia and much of Jones' command was transferred to East Tennessee. Initially, the regiment was ordered to remain to defend Saltville and the mines while its division went west, but on September 19 the battle at Chickamauga spurred Confederate war planners to order them to Tennessee as well.

Jones began a series of maneuvers and skirmishes around the Wautauga River against the Army of the Ohio under Maj. Gen. Ambrose Burnside. But when Burnside fell back on Knoxville by mid-October, Jones decided to return the 45th Virginia to Saltville, while the rest of the command joined in the campaign of James Longstreet to lay siege to the Army of the Ohio.

The regiment had already settled into winter quarters when a raid by Averell into the New River Valley threatened the Virginia and Tennessee Railroad again. December 16, the 45th Virginia set out for New River Bridge, then spent Christmas Day in the town of Salem, before the threat was ended and it returned to Saltville and winter quarters. On the final day of 1863, 918 men were listed on the roll as members of the regiment, 702 of whom were present, the rest presumably on sick leave or furlough.

== The 1864 Campaign in the Shenandoah Valley ==
See: Valley Campaigns of 1864

=== Crook and Averell's Raids ===
The regiment remained around Saltville through the winter, with many of the men reenlisting for the duration of the war. By early March, there was a debate as to whether the regiment belonged to Longstreet's command in East Tennessee with the rest of its brigade, or remained in the Department of Trans-Allegheny under its new head, Maj. Gen. John C. Breckinridge. It was decided for the latter. On the final day of April, roll shows that the regiment had 840 present.

By spring, the Union's new General-in-chief Maj. Gen. Ulysses S. Grant launched a new strategy for the war that coordinated action in all theaters. In southwestern Virginia and West Virginia, this meant Averell would move against Saltville and Wytheville, where substantial lead mines existed, and Brig. Gen. George Crook would cut the Virginia and Tennessee Railroad in New River Gorge. Then they would meet up with Maj. Gen. Franz Sigel, who was advancing on the Shenandoah Valley, at Lynchburg and march on to Richmond.

While John Hunt Morgan dealt with Averell, the 45th Virginia was hurried west to confront Crook. Brig. Gen. Albert G. Jenkins brigade of cavalry had halted Crook at Cloyd's Mountain and the 45th Virginia joined them there. Col. Browne spread out his companies on the Confederate left and faced the brunt of Crook's infantry, a brigade of Ohioans under the regiment's old opponent Rutherford B. Hayes, including the 23rd Ohio. Lt. Col. Harman, in command of that portion of the line, sent Major Davis for reinforcements from the 60th Virginia, who sent two companies, but while he was placing them he was struck by a musket ball and mortally wounded.

The Union soldiers were pushed back, but when the Confederates pursued them, they turned the tables and the Confederates began to run. Davis tried to stabilize the line, but intense hand-to-hand combat broke out and the flank as turned. Jenkins himself was hit in the arm while at the head of the 45th Virginia and carried form the battle field, mortally wounded, and cavalry Col. John McCausland assumed command. He ordered a full retreat that left much of the regiment's supply train on the field, along with 46 of its men that were captured, along with 96 wounded, and 26 killed, its worst casualties so far.

Crook, however, did not pursue, having heard of the heavy losses taken by the Army of the Potomac in the Wilderness north of Richmond, as well as the defeat of Sigel at the New Market. McCausland moved his army back into the territory, and a number of the men of the 45th Virginia became responsible for burying the dead on the Cloyd's Mountain battlefield on May 18. As the campaign north of Richmond became bloodier, Breckinridge was called to Richmond with a division of his command, and Brig. Gen. William "Grumble" Jones took over the remainder of the department. Sigel was replaced by Maj. Gen. David Hunter, with instructions to destroy Confederate property in the Shenandoah Valley, in order to deprive Lee's Army of Northern Virginia of supplies, particularly food.

=== The Lynchburg Campaign ===
Jones brought his troops north, into the Valley to stop Hunter, who had already burned Lexington. The 45th Virginia and the rest of Jones' men were transported by rail to Port Republic, but when Hunter did not appear began marching towards Staunton. On June 5, the two armies encountered each other at the village of Piedmont. The 45th Virginia took up position behind rail pens and endured a heavy Union artillery barrage. Hunter moved several regiments around the Confederate right flank under cover of woods, which Jones discovered too late. While trying to rally his men, he was struck in the head and killed.

The Confederates were routed, with heavy losses. The 45th Virginia suffered at least 325 men captured, dozens wounded, and six killed, though the poorly kept records almost certainly underestimate losses for the battle. Col. Browne was wounded and captured. A West Point classmate, Capt. Henry A. du Pont visited him in the hospital and loaned him some money for his imprisonment, but three days later his wounds took a bad turn and he died suddenly. Alexander Davis was also captured, along with three company commanders and two more were seriously wounded. The regiment also lost its colors, when they were seized by Pvt Thomas Evans, a Welsh immigrant in the 54th Pennsylvania, who would be awarded the Medal of Honor for his actions. The men slowly regrouped at Waynesboro with fewer than 300 remaining.

The regiment fell back to Lynchburg, now being led by the commander of Company E, the recently promoted Major Francis Miller, a Prussian immigrant who began the war as the regiment's commissary sergeant. In Lynchburg, they joined with Breckinridge, who had been returned to western Virginia to fight Hunter, who was advancing on Lynchburg with a sizable army. McCausland's cavalry managed to delay Hunter long enough for reinforcements to arrive from Lee under Maj. Gen. Jubal A. Early, who moved box cars back and forth loudly and successfully fooled Hunter into retreating.

=== Marching with Early ===
Early quickly reformed the troops at Lynchburg into the Army of the Valley and planned an offensive campaign to take pressure off of Lee. The 45th Virginia was placed in the brigade of their former major, Gabriel Wharton, now a brigadier general. The regiments march with Early down the Valley to Shepherdstown was its first with a unit larger than a brigade, and it crossed the Potomac River on July 5. Four days later, on July 9, Early fought a battle against a hodge-podge force of Union defenders under Lew Wallace at Monocacy Junction, but Wharton's brigade was held in reserve and saw no action.

By July 11, the men of the 45th Virginia could see the recently completed dome of the United States Capitol building from their position in Silver Spring. It was not involved in the fighting near Fort Stevens, though, and on July 13, Wharton's brigade began clearing Union troops to the army's rear as it fell back to the Potomac, including at Heaton's Crossroads and Cool Spring.

Throughout the retreat, Crook had been shadowing Early's movement to the west, but on July 24, Early suddenly attacked him at Kernstown. As part of Wharton's brigade, the 45th Virginia turned Crook's left flank and routed his army. The move freed John McCausland's cavalry to return Maryland, where he attempted to hold the city of Chambersburg ransom. When his price of $500,000 was not met, he ordered Col. William Peters – erstwhile commander of the 45th Virginia, now leading the 21st Virginia Cavalry – to burn the city. When he refused, he was arrested and McCausland set the city ablaze. "Remember Chambersburg" became a rallying cry for Northern troops.

Early remained in the lower Valley into August, when Maj. Gen. Philip Sheridan was put in command of all Union forces with orders to eliminate Early. Breckinridge had been transferred out of the theater again and Wharton assumed command of the division, with his brigade led by Col. Augustus Forsberg of the 51st Virginia. Over the next two weeks, Early and Sheridan took turns pursuing each other up and down the Valley, and the Confederates were reinforced by a division under Maj. Gen. Richard H. Anderson. Wharton's division led the pursuit of the Union back to Winchester, capturing about 200.

The 45th Virginia was held in reserve with the rest of Wharton's Division during the Battle of Summit Point on August 21. The pursuit and counter-pursuit continued. On September 4, Wharton was ordered to Berryville and found Anderson's men engaged with the division of Joseph Thoburn of Sheridan's army. The 45th Virginia and the rest of the division took up a position on Anderson's left flank and secured it, while the Confederates drove off Thoburn's men. But during the battle, Sheridan had been able to draw up the rest of his army, so Early ordered the Southerners to take up a position on Opequon Creek south of Winchester.

During August, Lee had lost control of the Weldon Railroad south of Petersburg as Grant extended his lines to the west. Anderson was ordered back to Petersburg with his men and Wharton's division was moved north of Winchester to defend the battery that would cover the movement on September 16. Sheridan ordered an all-out assault and caught Wharton's division well north of the town at 8:00 am. Around 11:00, cavalry under Brig. Gen. George A. Custer penetrated the line, but the Confederates eventually drove him back.

The division was withdrawn to about a mile north of Winchester, to link up with the rest of Early's line, with the 45th Virginia's brigade on the extreme left flank. Wharton's division was the focal point of a charge by Thoburn's division of Crook's army, which the 45th Virginia and its division turned back with heavy casualties. Thoburn reorganized and kept up the assaults and was joined by Averell's cavalry, who managed to get behind Forsberg's brigade. The division broke, followed by the army, and the men of the 45th Virginia ran back through town while Averell's cavalry rounded up prisoners. At least five members of the regiment were killed and 79 were captured.

Early drew a new battle line a few miles south at Fisher's Hill, with Wharton's division entrenched at the top, Forsberg's brigade connecting to the division of John B. Gordon. The division held off the larger Union division attacking it, but once again Thoburn's division along with the division of Rutherford Hayes turned the Confederate left flank and the army was routed. Wharton's men were able to form a rear guard and most of the army escaped up the Valley. Sheridan began a campaign to destroy everything that could be of use to the Confederate army.

Early took the opportunity to advance back down the Valley. By October 1, the army had reached Mount Sidney. In Forsberg's Brigade, only 417 men were listed present for duty, with probably fewer than 200 in the 45th Virginia. Sheridan, thinking that the Confederates in the Valley were no longer a threat, began withdrawing towards Winchester. The Confederates surprised Union troops camped near Hupp's Hill on October 13, and then took up defensive positions on Fisher's Hill, alerting Sheridan to the danger and leading him to order his full army of 30,000 to Cedar Creek.

Before dawn on October 19, Early put his small army into position to attack, surprising the sleeping Union army, with Sheridan not present. The 45th Virginia, their brigade now being led by Captain R.H. Logan, advanced on the extreme left with the division and swept the Union men in front of them from the field. Wharton's division was moved to the right, with the 45th Virginia's brigade again on the extreme flank. The starving division became caught up gorging themselves on Union supplies captured in Middleburg and soon the looting spread to the whole army. But the Union army was not yet routed, and Sheridan arrived on the battlefield, reorganizing his army. The Union crashed into Early's left, and the whole Southern army took flight, leaving the captured supplies and many of their own, too.

The army camped for several weeks at New Market and the 45th Virginia received 44 new conscripts from Richmond, mostly over the age of 45. Again, Sheridan withdrew north, and again Early followed him, but the army was too weakened to directly challenge the Union army and eventually returned to New Market. With the arrival of cold weather and no winter clothes or shoes, the 45th Virginia refused to drill in the snow on December 6 and was placed under arrest by the 51st Virginia at Wharton's orders with Captain Rufus Wainwright temporarily taking command of the regiment. By December 16, Wharton's Division was all that remained of Early's command, the rest having been returned to Lee's army in Petersburg. Over the final weeks of the year, they were marched out of camp in heavy snow to meet several Union advances, but no fighting took place.

== The End of the War and Disbandment ==
The first two months of 1865 passed without incident and on March 2, Wharton's Division and some remaining troops in southwestern Virginia now under Early's command was ordered to move east to support Lee's army. They got as far as Waynesboro, trailed by Custer's cavalry, before forming a line of battle to repulse the Union. Wharton's 800 men were quickly surrounded by the 7,500 Union cavalry and surrendered, though Wharton and Early both escaped. Some of the men of the 45th Virginia managed to escape as well, but Major Miller and 119 of the men were captured.

Those that got away regrouped at Charlottesville and were soon transferred back to Dublin by rail, and marched form there to Christiansburg, where, upon hearing the news of Lee's surrender at Appomattox Court House, they decided to disband.

Over the course of the war 1,947 men were listed as members of the 45th Virginia at some point during the war, though most of the regiment's records were poorly kept or not preserved, so it is unclear how many were considered true members of the regiment. Union prisoner of war records shows 600 members of the regiment as having been captured, 104 of whom died in captivity. The regiment's records show 65 deaths in battle and 143 deaths from disease or other reasons, some of which may be from wounds.

== See also ==
- List of Virginia Civil War units
