= 8th Virginia Cavalry Regiment =

Cavalry regiment of the Confederate States Army

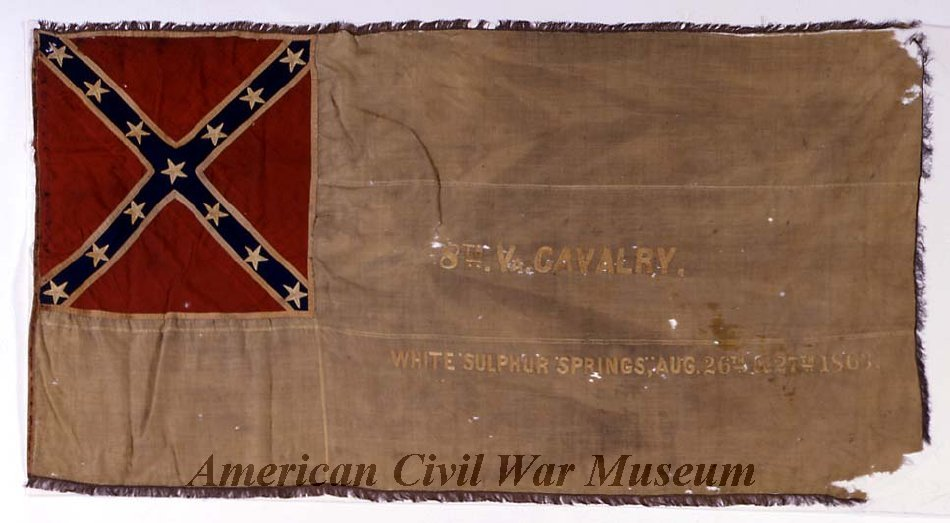
- National color of the 8th Virginia Cavalry at the American Civil War Museum in Richmond, Virginia
- Active: 1862–1865
- Disbanded: April 9, 1865
- Country: Confederate States
- Allegiance: Virginia
- Branch: Army
- Type: Cavalry
- Size: Regiment
- Facings: Yellow
- Battles: American Civil War; Battle of Lewisburg; Jenkins's Raid; Battle of Rogersville; Valley Campaigns of 1864; Appomattox Campaign; Battle of Five Forks

Commanders
- Notable commanders: Lieut. Col. Albert G. Jenkins

The 8th Virginia Cavalry Regiment was a cavalry formation of the Confederate States Army in the Eastern Theater of the American Civil War. The regiment was organized early in 1862 with nine companies but increased its number to eleven to July. Many of the men were recruited in Cabell, Wayne, Mercer, Fayette, Greenbrier, Bland, Smyth, Nelson, Kanawha, and Tazewell counties. The regiment fought in western Virginia, East Tennessee, western Virginia, Early's Shenandoah Valley operations, and Lee's Appomattox Campaign.

This regiment contained 225 effectives in April, 1864. Some claim that none were included in the surrender at Appomattox because it had cut through the Federal lines and disbanded, and that the field officers were Colonels James M. Corns and Walter H. Jenifer; Lieutenant Colonels Thomas P. Bowen, A.F. Cook, Henry Fitzhugh, and Albert G. Jenkins; and Major P.M. Edmondson. However, 2nd Lt. Hezekiah Harmon of Company A swore as a witness to the pension application of Angelina James, widow of S.P. James of the same company, that he and James surrendered at Appomattox on April 9, 1865, and that he "was present and saw all that I have stated". Validating Harmon's statement is the statement of the Adjutant General of the War Department of the United States, Brigadier General George Andrews, on November 21, 1912, on Angelina James' pension application, that "the records show that one S.P. James (not found as Stephen Porter James), private, Company A, 8th Virginia Cavalry, Confederate States Army, was enlisted June 27, 1863; that he was surrendered at Appomattox Court House, Virginia, and was paroled at that place April 9, 1865." This evidence lends strong weight to the 8th Cavalry having been at Appomattox at the surrender.

Former U.S. Congressman and Confederate Congressman Albert G. Jenkins recruited one of the unit's companies as a company of partisan rangers, before it was attached to the regiment and he became commanding officer of the 8th Virginia. He was killed at the Battle of Cloyd's Mountain.

== Companies and officers ==
Sortable table
Company	Nickname	Recruited at	First (then later) Commanding Officer
A	Smyth Dragoons	Smyth County	John Thompson; John P. Sheffey formerly attached to 50th Virginia Infantry
B	Nelson Rangers	Nelson County	Thomas P. Fitzpatrick; Isaac A. Paul formerly attached to 50th Virginia Infantry
C	Grayson Cavalry	Grayson County	William H. Bramblett; Richmond G. Bourne formerly attached to 50th Virginia Infantry
D	French's Company	Mercer County	William Henderson French later 33rd Battalion Virginia Cavalry, then Company D of 17th Virginia Cavalry
D1	Gunn's Rangers	Shenandoah Valley	William R. Gunn organized by Capt. Milton J. Ferguson and took place of moved Company D
E	Border Rangers; 2nd Kanawha	Kanawha Valley	(General)Albert G. Jenkins; James M. Corns; Formerly attached to 36th Virginia Infantry
F	Bland Rangers	Bland County	William Neel Harman
G	Mountain Rangers; Virginia Rebels	Monroe County; Putnam County	William E. Herndon; Otis Caldwell after merger with Caldwell's Battalion
H	Tazewell Troop	Mercer County; Tazewell County	John C. McDonald; Thomas P. Bowen; George W. Spotts; Achilles J. Tynes; Henry Bowen
I	Kanawha Rangers	Kanawha County; Fayette County	Tom Huddleston (killed 11/61); Charles I. Lewis organized by Dr. Charles I. Lewis and Col. C. Q. Tompkins as Company K of 22nd Virginia
K	Fairview Rifle Guards; Sandy Rangers	Kanawha County	James M. Corns; Joseph M. Ferguson; Formerly attached to 36th Virginia Infantry
L	White's Company of Cavalry	Greenbrier County	Moorman B. White; Transferred to 14th Virginia Cavalry then 36th Battalion Virginia Cavalry

== See also ==
- List of Virginia Civil War units
- List of West Virginia Civil War Confederate units
