= Lowry's Artillery =

Confederate States army unit

Lowry's Artillery Centerville Rifles
- Flag of Virginia
- Active: 8 June 1861 – 17 March 1865
- Country: Confederate States of America
- Branch: Confederate States Army
- Type: Artillery
- Size: Battery of six field guns
- Engagements: American Civil War: Giles Court House; Lewisburg; Fayetteville (Va.); Roanoke Island; Charleston; Knoxville Campaign; New Market; Lynchburg Campaign; Monocacy; Third Battle of Winchester; Fisher's Hill; Cedar Creek; Waynesboro; Petersburg Siege

Commanders
- Notable commanders: William M. Lowry

Lowry's Artillery, also known as the Centerville Rifles, was a unit of the Confederate States Army, and was organized by Dr. William M. Lowry in Monroe County, Virginia, with approximately 100 men. They were officially mustered into Confederate service on June 8, 1861. Dr. Lowry was elected captain, with George Beirne Chapman as 1st Lt., William V. Young as 2nd Lt., Charles Dunlap as 3rd Lt., John H. Pence as orderly sergeant, A.J. Keadle, 1st. Sgt., J.P. Shanklin, 2nd Sgt., and J.C. Woodson, 3rd Sgt. By the end of the war the unit had enrolled 219 men.

In July 1861 they became part of the brigade formed by Brig. Gen. Henry A. Wise in the Kanawha Valley, and were assigned to Maj. Wade Gibbes' artillery battalion. They participated in the western campaign of Robert E. Lee at Sewell and Cheat Mountain. In October they were transferred from Wise's command to that of Brig. Gen. John B. Floyd.

In December the battery was ordered to Richmond and became part of Wise's Legion, which was sent to the North Carolina coast, but they were then sent to Great Bridge, Va., after Union forces landed at Roanoke Island.

In April 1862 the battery returned to southwest Virginia. George Beirne Chapman resigned in order to form a new artillery battery of his own. Lowry's Battery was assigned to Henry Heth's Army of New River, which included Otey's, Chapman's and part of Bryan's Battery. They fought at Giles Court House on May 10, 1862, and at Lewisburg on May 23, where they lost their artillery pieces.

William W. Loring succeeded Heth as commander in mid-1862. The battery participated in the Kanawha Valley campaign in September. By the summer of 1863 they were serving under Brig. Gen. John Echols in Saltville, Va. In the fall of 1863 they were assigned to Col. Giltner's cavalry brigade and sent to east Tennessee, where they fought in several skirmishes.

They returned to central Virginia in June 1864, where they became part of Maj. McLaughlin's artillery battalion, along with Chapman's, Bryan's and Jackson's batteries. They received six new 12-pound smoothbore Napoleon cannon and for the rest of 1864 fought in the Shenandoah Valley in many skirmishes and seven major battles. The lack of ammunition limited their effectiveness at Winchester, Fisher's Hill and Cedar Creek.

In January 1865 they left their guns at Charlottesville, Va., due to a lack of forage for their horses, and went by rail to winter quarters in Dublin.

On their march to Salem on April 11, 1865, they learned of Lee's surrender and on the advice of Gen. Echols the unit disbanded. The battery suffered 24 casualties; 3 killed in action, 3 dead from disease, 6 wounded and 12 captured. It was the practice of Dr. Lowry to place his disabled men in private homes or send them home rather than to a hospital, so casualties were low.
