= District of the Kanawha =

District of the Kanawha, was a Union Army district during the American Civil War.

== Commander ==
- Brig. Gen. Jacob D. Cox Oct. 11, 1861 – August 15, 1862
- Colonel Joseph Andrew Jackson Lightburn August 17, 1862 – October 1862
- Major General Jacob D. Cox Oct 1862

== Posts in District of the Kanawha ==
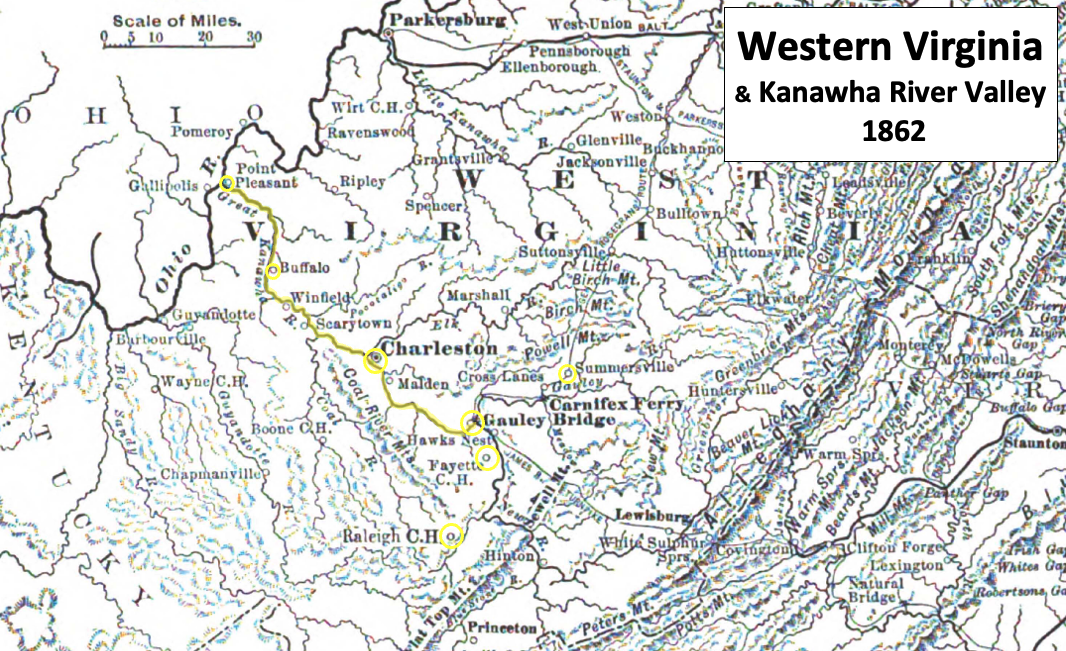
Union posts were located near the Kanawha River Valley because supplies could be brought from the Ohio River up the Kanawha River to Charleston using small steamboats.

- Post at Point Pleasant 1862
- Buffalo
- Charleston
- Gauley Bridge
  - Camp Tompkins (1861–1862), near Gauley Bridge
- Summersville
- Fayetteville
  - Fort Toland, (1862–1863), later renamed Fort Scammon.
  - Battery McMullan, near Fort Toland
- Raleigh Courthouse (a.k.a. Beckley)
