= Chapman's Artillery =

Confederate States army unit

- Flag of Virginia
- Active: 25 April 1862 – 17 March 1865
- Country: Confederate States of America
- Branch: Confederate States Army
- Type: Artillery
- Size: Battery of five field guns
- Nicknames: Monroe Artillery, Monroe "Dixie" Artillery
- Engagements: American Civil War: Giles Court House; Kanawha Campaign; Battle of Fayetteville; Charleston; White Sulphur Springs; Droop Mountain; Knoxville Campaign; Lynchburg Campaign; New Market; Monocacy; Third Winchester; Fisher's Hill; Cedar Creek; Waynesborough; Petersburg Siege

Commanders
- Notable commanders: George Beirne Chapman

Chapman's Artillery was an artillery battery in the Confederate States Army during the American Civil War. It was organized by George Beirne Chapman and was mustered into Confederate service at Lewisburg on April 25, 1862, with 150 men recruited from Monroe County, Greenbrier County, Allegheny County, and Roanoke County.

With little time to drill they were sent to Jackson River Depot, where they were issued a 24-pound howitzer, two 12-pound and two 6-pound cannons. They were assigned to Brig. Gen. Henry Heth's command and fought at White Sulphur Springs and Lewisburg on May 10 and 23, respectively. They were also part of Brig. Gen. William W. Loring's Kanawha Valley campaign in September 1862.

They were then assigned to the command of Brig. Gen. William L. Jackson and fought in small engagements in mid-1863, at White Sulphur Springs Aug. 26–27, and Droop Mountain on Nov. 6. In December Jackson stationed them at Sweet Springs Mountain to block Brig.-Gen. William W. Averell's retreat from his raid on the Virginia and Tennessee Railroad, but Averell escaped by another route.

They played an important part in the Confederate victory against Franz Sigel at New Market on May 15, 1864. They were sent to the defense of Richmond, fighting at Hanover Court House and along the Chickahominy River, and helping to halt the advance of Grant at Cold Harbor on June 3. They were then sent to the defense of Lynchburg, where they were joined by two other batteries, Lowry's and Bryan's.

After Lynchburg, the battery was issued six new 12-pound Napoleon cannons and was assigned to the command of Jubal Early in late 1864. They fought at Monocacy, Snicker's Ferry, Opequon, Fisher's Hill, and Cedar Creek. They suffered losses at the Third Battle of Winchester, where Cpt. Chapman was severely wounded, dying a week later from tetanus. Command passed to Lt. Frederick Thresher, and at his wounding the next week command passed to Lt. Henderson Reed. Opequon and Cedar Creek had a crippling effect on the battery. Their last engagement was the siege of Petersburg in March 1865. They were then ordered to turn over their equipment to other batteries and report to Richmond on March 17, 1865. The unit lost 13 men in battle, 15 to disease, 26 captured, and 28 in desertion.

George Beirne Chapman was the son of Augustus A. Chapman of Monroe County. Augustus Chapman was a brigadier-general of the 19th Brigade of Virginia Militia, which he commanded during the first few years of the war.
