= Alexander W. Reynolds =

United States Army officer

Alexander Welch Reynolds
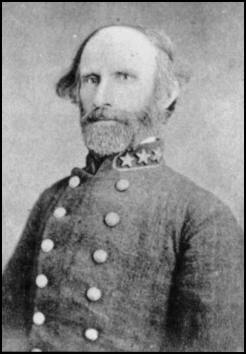
- Alexander Welch Reynolds
- Born: April 1816 or August 1817; Frederick County, Virginia
- Died: May 26, 1876 (aged 59–60); Alexandria, Egypt
- Military career
- Allegiance: United States of America; Confederate States of America; Egypt
- Branch: United States Army; Confederate States Army; Egyptian Army
- Service years: 1838–1855, 1858–1861 (USA); 1861–1865 (CSA); 1870–1876 (Egypt)
- Rank: Captain (USA); Brigadier General (CSA); Colonel (Egypt)
- Nickname: Gauley
- Unit: 1st U.S. Infantry
- Commands: 50th Virginia Infantry; Reynold's Brigade
- Conflicts: Mexican–American War; American Civil War: Vicksburg Campaign; Chattanooga campaign; Atlanta campaign

Alexander Welch Reynolds (April 1816 or August 1817 – May 26, 1876) was a career United States Army officer who served in the Mexican-American War and a Confederate Army brigadier general during the American Civil War, primarily fighting in the Western Theater. After the conflict he served as a staff officer in the Egyptian Army.

== Early life and career ==
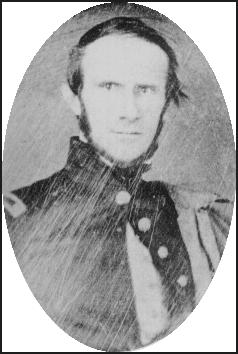
Reynolds as a United States Army captain

Alexander W. Reynolds was born in either 1816 or 1817 in Frederick County, Virginia. He entered the United States Military Academy at West Point in 1833, and graduated five years later, standing 35th out of 45 cadets. He was commissioned a second lieutenant in the 1st U.S. Infantry on July 1, 1838. Reynolds was promoted to first lieutenant on June 11, 1839, and was the 1st's Regimental Adjutant from October 19 to March 1, 1840.

During the Mexican–American War, Reynolds was a captain in the U.S. Army, serving as the Army's assistant Quartermaster beginning August 4, 1847. He was at this rank on March 15, 1848, when he vacated his line commission. Reynolds was dismissed from the U.S. Army on October 8, 1855, following the disappearance of US$126,307 from Reynolds' office in Santa Fe, where he was stationed. At the time of his dismissal he held multiple quartermaster positions, through which he was engaging in double billing, over billing and theft of government funds. Reynolds also owned full or partial interest in two sawmills, two gold mines, four ranches, two homes, three hotels and multiple town lots. However, three years later, with help from his political connections, he had himself restored to the service at his previous rank of captain as of March 29, 1858.

== Civil War service ==
During the American Civil War, Reynolds chose to follow his home state and the Confederate cause. He went AWOL from the U.S. Army while serving in Texas and entered the Confederate States Army in 1861. He was appointed a captain in the Confederate Infantry on March 16, 1861, and promoted to colonel of the 50th Virginia Infantry on July 10, 1861. His soldiers called him "Old Gauley."

Reynolds first served under Brigadier General John B. Floyd in western Virginia. In March 1862, Reynolds was sent to the Western Theater. He joined Edmund Kirby Smith's command in the Army of Kentucky throughout the rest of 1861 and most of 1862. After the Kentucky Campaign failed in its object, Smith's army joined General Braxton Bragg's Army of Tennessee in a reorganization of Confederate forces in the Western Theater. On December 16, 1862, Confederate President Jefferson Davis ordered the transfer of Major General Carter L. Stevenson's division to Lieutenant General John C. Pemberton's army. Reynolds utilized the political connections of his brother-in-law, Virginia Delegate Mason Mathews, to lobby for his promotion to general officer with Secretary of War James Seddon. General Reynolds, commanding a brigade in Stevenson's division, went with his troops to Vicksburg.

=== Vicksburg ===
Unlike the other three brigades of Stevenson's division, Reynolds' brigade suffered only lightly at the Battle of Champion's Hill. During the Siege of Vicksburg his brigade held a portion of the southernmost sector near the "Salient Work". His brigade lost 14 killed, 25 wounded, and 14 missing during the siege. Reynolds' brigade was part of the garrison that surrendered on July 4, 1863. Reynolds was taken prisoner.

=== Chattanooga ===
Reynolds was exchanged on October 13, 1863, and promoted to brigadier general to rank from September 14, 1863. Reynolds led a brigade in Maj. Gen. Simon Bolivar Buckner's division during the Chattanooga campaign. After Confederate President Davis ordered Lt. Gen. James Longstreet to recapture Knoxville, Tennessee, Buckner's division was sent as a reinforcement. When the Union army attacked Bragg on 23 November, Reynolds' brigade was still waiting to board the trains that would take them to Knoxville. Detached from its parent division, Bragg sent it into the fight.

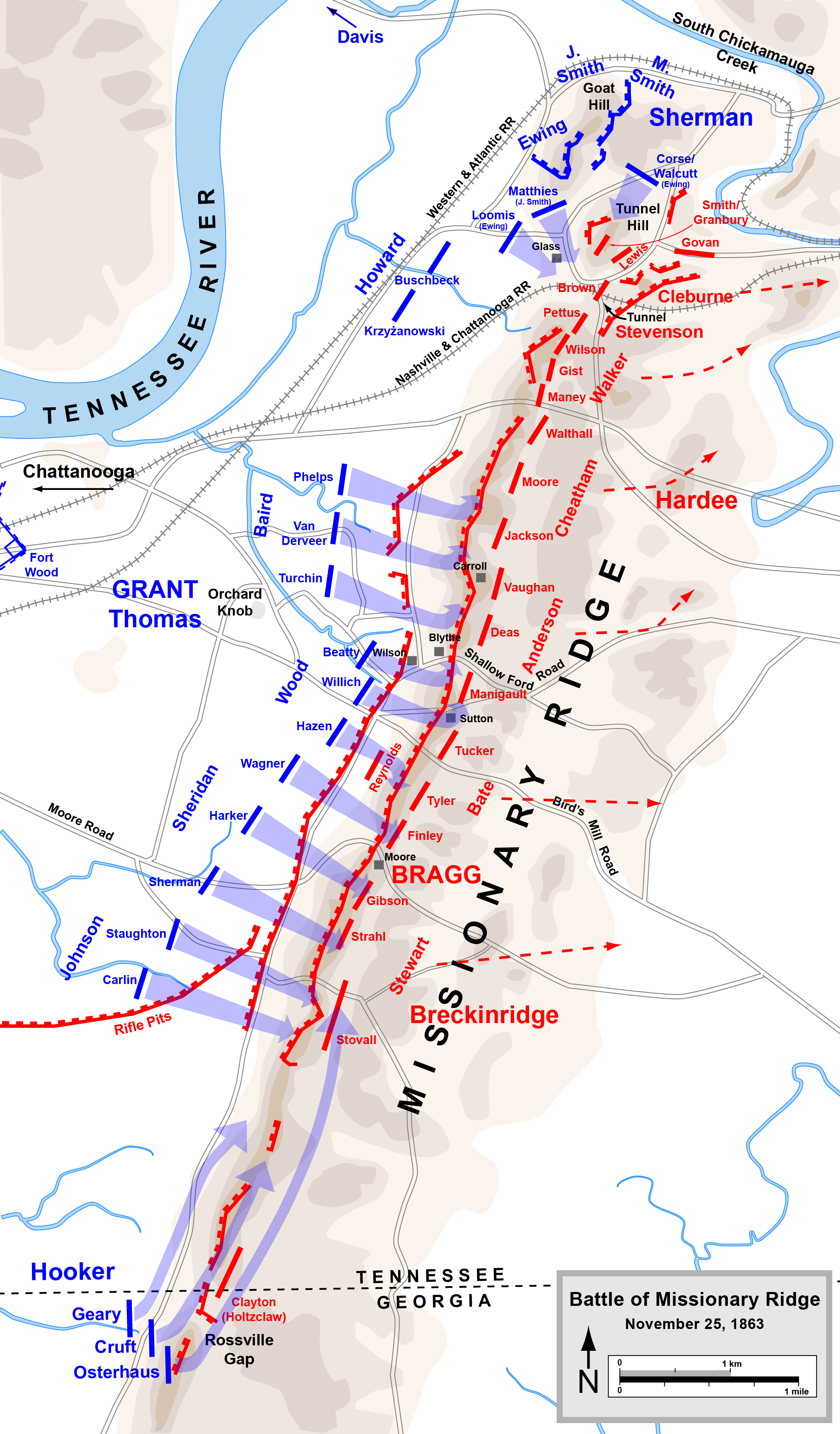
1863's Battle of Missionary Ridge. Reynold's force is near the center of the map.

In the Battle of Missionary Ridge, Bragg and corps commander John C. Breckinridge probably committed a serious tactical blunder in placing the troops of Reynolds and other brigades in a first line of breastworks at the base of the ridge. In case of a Federal attack, the two generals intended for Reynolds' men to fire a single volley and fall back to a position on the crest where a gap was deliberately left. To compound the error, Bragg ordered Reynolds to move his brigade back to the top of the ridge early in the afternoon. Coincidentally, his men began pulling back just as the main Union attack began. This encouraged the attacking Federals and demoralized nearby Confederate troops in the first line. Reynolds' troops were winded by the time they reached their empty position on the crest. When Union soldiers broke through the next brigade to the north, his exhausted men put up a brief resistance before retreating.

=== Atlanta ===
Reynolds continued in brigade command in the Army of Tennessee during the Atlanta campaign of 1864. He served in Stevenson's division of Lt. Gen. John Bell Hood's Corps. He fought at the battles of Rocky Face Ridge, Resaca, and Adairsville before being wounded in the Battle of New Hope Church on May 27. Upon recovery from his wounds, Reynolds was appointed assistant Inspector General of the District of Georgia in 1865 until the end of the war. He was paroled at Athens, Georgia, on May 8.

== Postbellum ==
Reynolds entered the service of Egypt in 1869 as a colonel in the Egyptian Army. Egyptian chief of staff, Charles Pomeroy Stone assigned Reynolds to serve as Quartermaster, Commissary officer, and paymaster general. He and his wife (whom he referred to as duchess), and his son Frank, and Frank's wife and son took up residence in Alexandria, Egypt. They became friends with a small circle of American expatriates that included Stone, William W. Loring, and Raleigh E. Colston.

Tragedy struck the Reynolds family in 1875. The previous year Frank Reynolds had returned to the United States with his wife and son to buy Remington rifles for the Egyptian government. In 1875, Frank became sick and died in Ilion, New York. After this, Mrs. Reynolds returned to Philadelphia, Pennsylvania, where she soon died. At this time, Reynolds lost his support group of expatriates when most of the American officers left for the war against Ethiopia. With his pay from the Egyptian government in arrears and owing his creditors money, he was forced to move into a seedy boarding house. He died in bed there on May 26, 1876. According to gossip, alcoholism was a contributing factor.

The exact whereabouts of Alexander W. Reynolds's remains are not known; they could be in an unmarked grave in Alexandria or in the Patton Tomb located in Lewisburg, West Virginia, at the Old Stone Presbyterian Churchyard. In Reynolds's memory a cenotaph was erected in St. James the Less Cemetery located in Philadelphia.

== See also ==
- List of American Civil War generals (Confederate)
