= Department of East Tennessee and West Virginia =

Territorial department of the Confederate States Army

- Active: 1861–1865
- Country: Confederate States
- Branch: Army
- Type: Territorial department
- Wars: American Civil War

The Department of East Tennessee and West Virginia was a Confederate Army command in the Trans-Allegheny Theater during the American Civil War. This department existed in two previous forms during the war.

== Department of Southwestern Virginia ==
Organized May 8, 1861 for the mountainous region of southwest Virginia and present-day southern West Virginia.

Commanders:

- William W. Loring - May 8, 1861 - October 16, 1862
- John Echols - October 16, 1862 - November 19, 1862
- John Stuart Williams - November 19, 1862 - November 21, 1862

== Trans-Allegheny Department ==
Renamed on November 25, 1862 and extended to the border of eastern Kentucky. On September 25, extended to include the areas of southwestern Virginia formerly encompassed by the Department of East Tennessee and forces east of Knoxville. On March 19, 1864, the area around Saltville, Virginia was added to the department and, briefly from April 23 to May 2, the entirety of the Department of East Tennessee was added to the department.

Commanding generals:

- John Stuart Williams (temp.) - November 21, 1862 - December 10, 1862
- Samuel Jones - December 10, 1862 - February 25, 1864
- John C. Breckinridge - February 25, 1864 - May 23, 1864
- William "Grumble" Jones - May 23, 1864 - May 31, 1864
- George B. Crittenden (temp.) - May 31, 1864 - June 22, 1864
- John H. Morgan (temp.) - June 22, 1864 - August 22, 1864
- John Echols (temp.) - August 22, 1864 - September 17, 1864
- John C. Breckinridge - September 17, 1864 - September 27, 1864

== Department of East Tennessee and Southwestern Virginia ==
Organized September 27, 1864. The Valley District was added on April 9, 1865 from the Department of Northern Virginia.

Commanders:

- John C. Breckinridge - September 27, 1864 - February 20, 1865
- Jubal A. Early - February 20, 1865 - March 29, 1865
- John Echols - March 29, 1865 - April 19, 1865

== Department of Tennessee and Georgia ==
Merged with the Department of Tennessee and Georgia on April 19, 1865.

== Sources ==
- Eicher, John H., & Eicher, David J., Civil War High Commands, Stanford University Press, 2001, ISBN 0-8047-3641-3.
