= 50th Virginia Infantry Regiment =

- Flag of Virginia, 1861
- Active: July 1861 – April 1865
- Disbanded: April 1865
- Country: Confederate States of America
- Branch: Confederate States Army
- Type: Infantry
- Engagements: American Civil War: Battle of Carnifex Ferry; Battle of Fort Donelson; Battle of Charleston (1862); Battle of Chancellorsville; Battle of Gettysburg; Battle of the Wilderness; Battle of Cold Harbor; Valley Campaigns of 1864; Battle of Waynesboro, Virginia

Commanders
- Notable commanders: Colonel Alexander W. Reynolds

The 50th Virginia Infantry Regiment was an infantry regiment raised in Virginia for service in the Confederate States Army during the American Civil War. It fought mostly with the Army of Northern Virginia and in Tennessee.

The 50th Virginia was organized in July 1861, with ten companies and three companies of cavalry temporarily attached. The regiment participated in the Battle of Carnifex Ferry on 10 September 1861; afterwards one of the cavalry companies was disabled and the other two transferred to the 8th Regiment Virginia Cavalry.

The unit was reorganized in May 1862, with nine companies. It moved to Tennessee and in February 1862, was captured at Fort Donelson. After being exchanged, it was assigned to the Department of Western Virginia and fought in Gen. Wm. W. Loring's Kanawha Valley Campaign of 1862 and participated in the capture of Charleston, Virginia (now, West Virginia) on 13 September 1862.

Later the 50th served in J.M. Jones', G.C. Wharton's, and Augustus Forsberg's Brigade, Army of Northern Virginia. It participated in numerous conflicts from Chancellorsville to Cold Harbor, moved with Jubal Early to the Shenandoah Valley, and fought its last battle at Waynesboro.

The regiment reported 10 killed and 40 wounded at Fort Donelson, and there were 8 killed and 110 wounded at Chancellorsville. More than forty percent of the 240 engaged at Gettysburg were disabled, and it sustained heavy casualties in the fight at The Wilderness. During April 1865, it disbanded.

The field officers were Colonels Thomas Poage, Alexander W. Reynolds, and A.S. Vandeventer; Lieutenant Colonels William W. Finney and Logan H. N. Salyer; and Majors Lynville J. Perkins and C.E. Thorburn.

== See also ==
- List of Virginia Civil War units
