= Battle of Cloyd's Mountain order of battle =

The following American Civil War units were involved in the Battle of Cloyd's Mountain on May 9, 1864, in Southwest Virginia's Pulaski County. The Union Army units, and their commanders, are listed first. The Confederate Army units, and their commanders, follow. A Union force led by Brigadier General George Crook defeated a Confederate force led by Brigadier General Albert G. Jenkins. Future Presidents Rutherford B. Hayes and William McKinley both fought in the battle. Jenkins was mortally wounded and captured.

== Abbreviations used ==
=== Military rank ===
- BG = Brigadier General
- Col = Colonel
- Ltc = Lieutenant Colonel
- Maj = Major
- Capt = Captain
- Lt = 1st Lieutenant

=== Other ===
- w = wounded
- mw = mortally wounded
- k = killed
- det = Detachment
- MOH = Medal of Honor

All infantry and cavalry units are regiments unless noted otherwise.

== Union 2nd Infantry Division, Department of West Virginia ==
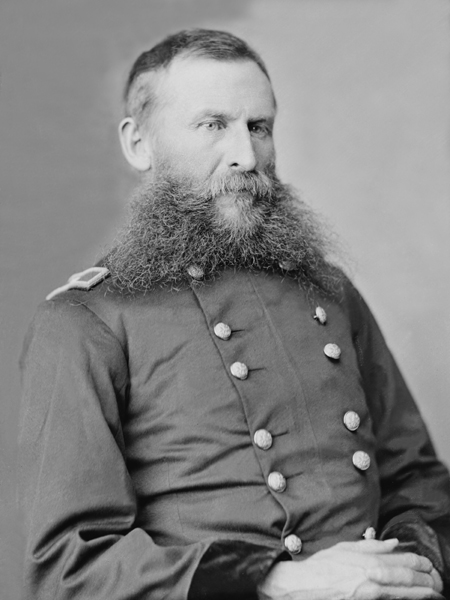
BG Crook

BG George Crook — commander

- The division was also known as the Kanawha Division.
- The division originally consisted of 6,155 soldiers, but was joined by a cavalry detachment numbering 400 that brought Crook's force to 6,555.
- Crook's objective was to disable the Virginia and Tennessee Railroad and a railroad bridge that crossed the New River not far from the railroad's Dublin Depot.
- Two members of the 23rd Ohio Infantry eventually became president of the United States: Rutherford B. Hayes and William McKinley.

Brigade	Regiments and Others
1st Brigade Col Rutherford B. Hayes (23rd Ohio Infantry)	23rd Ohio Infantry — Ltc James M. Comly; 36th Ohio Infantry — Col Hiram F. Devol; 34th Ohio Mounted Infantry (detachment) — (attached to 36th Ohio); 7th West Virginia Cavalry (detachment) — Col John H. Oley; 5th West Virginia Cavalry (detachment) — Maj D.D. Barclay; Additional Information: The 34th Ohio Mounted Infantry detachment was dismounted.; Among the 34th Ohio detachment that died in the battle in action, from wounds, or later in prison, were members of Companies A, B, and D.; The 5th West Virginia Cavalry detachment was dismounted for the battle, but mounted for part of the pursuit.; Companies C, E, and I are mentioned as being part of the detachment for the 5th West Virginia.; The cavalry detachment had "many with broken-down horses". A portion was dismounted.; The combined detachments of the 36th and 34th Ohio Infantries amounted to about 500 soldiers.
2nd Brigade Col Carr B. White (12th Ohio Infantry)	12th Ohio Infantry — Col Jonathan D. Hines; 91st Ohio Infantry — Col John A. Turley; 9th West Virginia Infantry — Col Isaac H. Duval; 14th West Virginia Infantry — Col Daniel D. Johnson; Additional Information: White's report calls the West Virginia regiments "Virginia" regiments. (Note: Virginia military units (regiments, battalions, etc.) that were loyal to the union were often noted with "union" or "loyal" in their name. On June 20, 1863, the new state of West Virginia, consisting of northwestern counties of Virginia, joined the union—and Virginia military units loyal to the union became West Virginia units.)
3rd Brigade Col Horatio G. Sickel (3rd Pennsylvania Reserves)	3rd Pennsylvania Reserve — Capt Jacob Lenhart (w), Capt Robert Johnson; 4th Pennsylvania Reserve — Col Richard H. Woolworth (k), Ltc Thomas F. B. Tapper; 11th West Virginia Infantry — Col Daniel Frost; 15th West Virginia Infantry — Ltc Thomas Morris
Artillery Capt James R. McMullin	1st Ohio Battery — Lt G.P. Kirtland; 1st Kentucky Battery — Capt David W. Glassie

== Confederate Department of Western Virginia ==
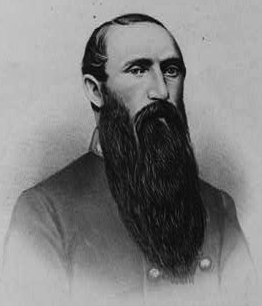
BG Jenkins

BG Albert G. Jenkins — commander (mw), Col John McCausland

- In addition to being seriously wounded, Jenkins was captured. He died on May 24, 1864.
- Approximately 2,350 soldiers were in Jenkins' command.
- Jenkins chose to intercept Crook's army on the Dublin-Pearisburg Pike at Cloyd Farm (also known as Back Creek Farm) on a mountain near Back Creek.
- For the battle, Jenkins had ten artillery pieces from Bryans's Lewisburg ((West) Virginia) Battery and the Danville-Ringgold (Virginia) Battery.
- The Botetourt Artillery fought on May 10 at the New River bridge.

Brigade	Regiments and Others
4th Brigade Col John McCausland (36th Virginia Infantry)	36th Virginia Infantry — Ltc Thomas Smith (w), Maj William E. Fife; 60th Virginia Infantry — Col Beuhring H. Jones; 45th Virginia Infantry Battalion — Ltc Henry M. Beckley; Additional Information: Ltc Thomas Smith was captured in addition to being seriously wounded.; Ltc George W. Hammond and Maj Jacob N. Taylor of the 60th Virginia Infantry were killed in action.; Beckley's 45th Virginia Infantry Battalion had 183 soldiers and officers present for the battle.
Additional Support	45th Virginia Infantry — Col William H. Browne; Danville-Ringgold (Virginia) Battery — Capt Crispin Dickenson; Home Guard; Montgomery Home Guards — Capt White G. Ryan; (Other home guards); Additional Information: The 45th Virginia Infantry's Ltc E. H. Harman was mortally wounded.
4th Brigade Artillery Capt Thomas A. Bryan (w)	Bryan's Lewisburg ((West) Virginia) Battery — Lt G.A. Fowlkes; Additional Information: Captain Bryan's horse was killed while he was riding, and Bryan was injured falling from the horse.
Additional Support During Retreat or Pursuit	Morgan's Detachment - Colonel D. Howard Smith of 5th Kentucky Cavalry; 5th Kentucky Cavalry (detachment); 10th Kentucky Cavalry (detachment) - Maj George Diamond; Botetourt Virginia Light Artillery — Capt Henry C. Douthat; 17th Virginia Cavalry — Col William H. French; Additional Information: The detachment from John Hunt Morgan's command was dismounted and consisted of 400 to 500 fighters. It arrived in Dublin, Virginia at about 1:00 pm. While proceeding to Cloyd's Farm, it encountered retreating Confederate troops and was asked to intercept the pursuing Union troops. It also took part in subsequent action near the New River Bridge. While not present at Cloyd's Farm, Morgan's 53 casualties are listed as part of the total 538 Confederate casualties for the battle, which include the May 9 engagement at Cloyd's Farm and "subsequent operations".; The 17th Virginia Cavalry had two casualties included in the total 538 Confederate casualties listed for the battle on May 9 and "subsequent operations". They were not in the battle at Cloyd's Mountain or at New River Bridge, but they were involved in the pursuit of Crook's division and Averell's cavalry.; The Botetourt Artillery consisted of eight artillery pieces, and it fought at the New River Bridge on May 10. It had one casualty when one soldier was injured after being thrown from his horse. This casualty was included in the 538 Confederate casualties listed for the battle on May 9 and "subsequent operations".

== See also ==
- List of orders of battle

== Notes ==
=== References ===
- Beckley, Henry M. (1891). "Report of Lieut. Col. Henry M. Beckley...". In Scott, Robert N. (ed.). The War of the Rebellion: a Compilation of the Official Records of the Union and Confederate Armies Series I Volume XXXVII Part I. Washington, DC: Government Printing Office. pp. 54–55. OCLC 318422190.
- Browne, William H. (1891). "Report of Col. William H. Browne...". In Scott, Robert N. (ed.). The War of the Rebellion: a Compilation of the Official Records of the Union and Confederate Armies Series I Volume XXXVII Part I. Washington, DC: Government Printing Office. pp. 52–53. OCLC 318422190.
- Comly, James M. (1891). "Report of Lieut. Col. James M. Comly...". In Scott, Robert N. (ed.). The War of the Rebellion: a Compilation of the Official Records of the Union and Confederate Armies Series I Volume XXXVII Part I. Washington, DC: Government Printing Office. p. 15. OCLC 318422190.
- Cozzens, Peter (October 1997). "Fire on the Mountain". Civil War Times Illustrated (ProQuest). 35 (5). Gettysburg, Pennsylvania: EBSCO: 60–73.
- Crook, George (1891). "Report of Brig. Gen. George Crook...". In Scott, Robert N. (ed.). The War of the Rebellion: a Compilation of the Official Records of the Union and Confederate Armies Series I Volume XXXVII Part I. Washington, DC: Government Printing Office. pp. 9–14. OCLC 318422190.
- Devol, Hiram F. (1891). "Report of Col. Hiram F. Devol...". In Scott, Robert N. (ed.). The War of the Rebellion: a Compilation of the Official Records of the Union and Confederate Armies Series I Volume XXXVII Part I. Washington, DC: Government Printing Office. p. 16. OCLC 318422190.
- Dickenson, Crispin (1891). "Report of Capt. Crispin Diskenson...". In Scott, Robert N. (ed.). The War of the Rebellion: a Compilation of the Official Records of the Union and Confederate Armies Series I Volume XXXVII Part I. Washington, DC: Government Printing Office. pp. 60–61. OCLC 318422190.
- Douthat, Henry C. (1891). "Report of Capt. Henry C. Douthat...". In Scott, Robert N. (ed.). The War of the Rebellion: a Compilation of the Official Records of the Union and Confederate Armies Series I Volume XXXVII Part I. Washington, DC: Government Printing Office. p. 58. OCLC 318422190.
- Duncan, Richard R. (1998). Lee's Endangered Left: The Civil War in Western Virginia, Spring of 1864. Baton Rouge, Louisiana: Louisiana State University Press. OCLC 940541407.
- Duval, Isaac H. (1891). "Report of Col. Isaac H. Duval...". In Scott, Robert N. (ed.). The War of the Rebellion: a Compilation of the Official Records of the Union and Confederate Armies Series I Volume XXXVII Part I. Washington, DC: Government Printing Office. pp. 20–21. OCLC 318422190.
- Fife, William E. (1891). "Report of Maj. William E. Fife...". In Scott, Robert N. (ed.). The War of the Rebellion: a Compilation of the Official Records of the Union and Confederate Armies Series I Volume XXXVII Part I. Washington, DC: Government Printing Office. pp. 49–51. OCLC 318422190.
- Fowlkes, Giles A. (1891). "Report of Lieut. Giles A. Fowlkes...". In Scott, Robert N. (ed.). The War of the Rebellion: a Compilation of the Official Records of the Union and Confederate Armies Series I Volume XXXVII Part I. Washington, DC: Government Printing Office. p. 59. OCLC 318422190.
- French, William H. (1891). "Report of Col. William H. French...". In Scott, Robert N. (ed.). The War of the Rebellion: a Compilation of the Official Records of the Union and Confederate Armies Series I Volume XXXVII Part I. Washington, DC: Government Printing Office. pp. 62–64. OCLC 318422190.
- Frost, Daniel (1891). "Report of Col. Daniel Frost...". In Scott, Robert N. (ed.). The War of the Rebellion: a Compilation of the Official Records of the Union and Confederate Armies Series I Volume XXXVII Part I. Washington, DC: Government Printing Office. pp. 33–35. OCLC 318422190.
- Hayes, Rutherford B. (1891). "Report of Col. Rutherford B. Hayes...". In Scott, Robert N. (ed.). The War of the Rebellion: a Compilation of the Official Records of the Union and Confederate Armies Series I Volume XXXVII Part I. Washington, DC: Government Printing Office. p. 14. OCLC 318422190.
- Hines, Johnathan D. (1891). "Report of Lieut. Col. Jonathan D. Hines...". In Scott, Robert N. (ed.). The War of the Rebellion: a Compilation of the Official Records of the Union and Confederate Armies Series I Volume XXXVII Part I. Washington, DC: Government Printing Office. pp. 18–19. OCLC 318422190.
- Johnson, Robert (1891). "Report of Capt. Robert Johnson...". In Scott, Robert N. (ed.). The War of the Rebellion: a Compilation of the Official Records of the Union and Confederate Armies Series I Volume XXXVII Part I. Washington, DC: Government Printing Office. pp. 28–31. OCLC 318422190.
- Jones, Beuhring H. (1891). "Report of Col. Beuhring H. Jones...". In Scott, Robert N. (ed.). The War of the Rebellion: a Compilation of the Official Records of the Union and Confederate Armies Series I Volume XXXVII Part I. Washington, DC: Government Printing Office. pp. 56–58. OCLC 318422190.
- McCausland, John (1891). "Reports of Col. John McCausland...". In Scott, Robert N. (ed.). The War of the Rebellion: a Compilation of the Official Records of the Union and Confederate Armies Series I Volume XXXVII Part I. Washington, DC: Government Printing Office. pp. 44–49. OCLC 318422190.
- McMullin, James R. (1891). "Report of Capt. James R. McMullin...". In Scott, Robert N. (ed.). The War of the Rebellion: a Compilation of the Official Records of the Union and Confederate Armies Series I Volume XXXVII Part I. Washington, DC: Government Printing Office. p. 38. OCLC 318422190.
- Morris, Thomas (1891). "Report of Lieut. Col. Thomas Morris...". In Scott, Robert N. (ed.). The War of the Rebellion: a Compilation of the Official Records of the Union and Confederate Armies Series I Volume XXXVII Part I. Washington, DC: Government Printing Office. pp. 35–37. OCLC 318422190.
- Ohio Roster Commission (1886). Official Roster of the Soldiers of the State of Ohio in the War of the Rebellion, 1861-1866, Vol. III. Cincinnati, Ohio: Ohio Valley Publishing and Manufacturing Co. OCLC 37199818. Archived from the original on July 29, 2024.
- Perry, Robert (1998). Jack May's War: Colonel Andrew Jackson May and the Civil War in Eastern Kentucky, Eastern Tennessee, and Virginia. Johnson City, Tennessee: Overmountain Press. ISBN 978-1-57072-071-0. OCLC 1037218088.
- Reader, Frank S. (1891). History of the Fifth West Virginia Cavalry. New Brighton, Pennsylvania: Daily News, Frank S. Reader, editor and Prop'r. OCLC 1336164695. Archived from the original on July 14, 2024.
- Sickel, Horatio G. (1891). "Report of Col. Horatio G. Sickel...". In Scott, Robert N. (ed.). The War of the Rebellion: a Compilation of the Official Records of the Union and Confederate Armies Series I Volume XXXVII Part I. Washington, DC: Government Printing Office. pp. 23–28. OCLC 318422190.
- Smith, D. Howard (1891). "Report of Col. D. Howard Smith...". In Scott, Robert N. (ed.). The War of the Rebellion: a Compilation of the Official Records of the Union and Confederate Armies Series I Volume XXXVII Part I. Washington, DC: Government Printing Office. pp. 66–68. OCLC 318422190.
- Tapper, Thomas B. B. (1891). "Report of Lieut. Col. Thomas F. B. Tapper...". In Scott, Robert N. (ed.). The War of the Rebellion: a Compilation of the Official Records of the Union and Confederate Armies Series I Volume XXXVII Part I. Washington, DC: Government Printing Office. pp. 31–33. OCLC 318422190.
- Turley, John A. (1891). "Report of Col. John A. Turley...". In Scott, Robert N. (ed.). The War of the Rebellion: a Compilation of the Official Records of the Union and Confederate Armies Series I Volume XXXVII Part I. Washington, DC: Government Printing Office. pp. 19–20. OCLC 318422190.
- Wallace, Lee A. (1986). A Guide to Virginia Military Organizations 1861-1865. Lynchburg, Virginia: H.E. Howard, Inc. ISBN 978-0-93091-930-6. OCLC 1003746760.
- White, Carr B. (1891). "Report of Col. Carr B. White...". In Scott, Robert N. (ed.). The War of the Rebellion: a Compilation of the Official Records of the Union and Confederate Armies Series I Volume XXXVII Part I. Washington, DC: Government Printing Office. pp. 16–17. OCLC 318422190.
