= National Register of Historic Places listings in Pulaski County, Virginia =

Location of Pulaski County in Virginia

This is a list of the National Register of Historic Places listings in Pulaski County, Virginia.

This is intended to be a complete list of the properties and districts on the National Register of Historic Places in Pulaski County, Virginia, United States. The locations of National Register properties and districts for which the latitude and longitude coordinates are included below, may be seen in an online map.

There are 25 properties and districts listed on the National Register in the county. Another property was once listed but has been removed.

This National Park Service list is complete through NPS recent listings posted September 25, 2026.

== Current listings ==
	Name on the Register	Image	Date listed	Location	City or town	Description
1	Back Creek Farm	Back Creek Farm	May 21, 1975 (#75002032)	Northwest of Dublin off State Route 100; 37°09′53″N 80°42′30″W	Dublin	
2	Belle-Hampton	Belle-Hampton	November 13, 1989 (#89001911)	Highland Rd., 0.3 miles north of Neck Creek Rd. 37°10′41″N 80°39′38″W	Dublin	
3	Calfee Athletic Field	Calfee Athletic Field	November 22, 2000 (#00001432)	Washington and Pierce Aves., SE. 37°02′22″N 80°46′33″W	Pulaski	
4	Calfee Training School		March 22, 2022 (#100007539)	1 Corbin-Harmon Dr. 37°02′54″N 80°47′12″W	Pulaski	
5	Claremont Elementary School		August 9, 2021 (#100006822)	800 Ridge Ave. 37°03′15″N 80°45′36″W	Pulaski	
6	Dalton Theatre Building	Dalton Theatre Building	May 7, 1979 (#79003074)	Washington Ave. 37°02′49″N 80°46′47″W	Pulaski	
7	Draper Historic District	Draper Historic District	February 21, 2020 (#100004991)	Greenbriar Rd./Old Baltimore Rd. and adjacent 37°00′06″N 80°44′32″W	Draper	
8	Dublin High School		October 1, 2026 (#100013469)	650 Giles Avenue; 37°06′40″N 80°41′22″W	Dublin	
9	Dublin Historic District	Dublin Historic District	October 15, 1992 (#92001369)	Roughly Giles Ave. from Long to Main Sts., Church St. from Giles to Linkous Ave., and E. Main from Giles to Ziegler St. 37°06′29″N 80°41′16″W	Dublin	
10	Fairview District Home	Fairview District Home	August 29, 1997 (#97001073)	Western side of Cougar Trail Rd. 37°05′43″N 80°43′10″W	Dublin	
11	John Hoge House	John Hoge House	August 25, 1988 (#88001320)	Northwestern side of Neck Creek Rd. 37°10′40″N 80°37′44″W	Belspring	
12	Haven B. Howe House	Haven B. Howe House	April 15, 2008 (#08000321)	4400 State Park Rd. 37°03′26″N 80°37′13″W	Dublin	
13	Ingles Ferry	Ingles Ferry	November 25, 1969 (#69000275)	Wilderness Rd. 37°06′05″N 80°35′29″W	Radford	
14	New Dublin Presbyterian Church	New Dublin Presbyterian Church	November 26, 2004 (#04001272)	New Dublin Church Rd. 37°07′23″N 80°41′17″W	Dublin	
15	Newbern Historic District	Newbern Historic District	June 4, 1979 (#79003073)	Newbern Rd. 37°04′24″N 80°41′30″W	Newbern	
16	Pulaski County Courthouse	Pulaski County Courthouse	July 8, 1982 (#82004582)	Main St. 37°02′54″N 80°46′53″W	Pulaski	
17	Pulaski High School		June 9, 2023 (#100009049)	500 Pico Ter. 37°03′04″N 80°46′21″W	Pulaski	
18	Pulaski Historic Commercial District	Pulaski Historic Commercial District	March 13, 1986 (#86000405)	Roughly bounded by 3rd St., Madison Ave., the Norfolk Southern railroad tracks, and Randolph Ave. 37°02′51″N 80°46′52″W	Pulaski	
19	Pulaski Historic Residential District	Pulaski Historic Residential District	August 11, 1988 (#88001216)	Roughly bounded by 11th St., Prospect, Madison, and Washington Aves., 2nd St., and Henry Ave. 37°03′10″N 80°46′56″W	Pulaski	
20	Pulaski South Historic Residential and Industrial District	Pulaski South Historic Residential and Industrial District	October 29, 1991 (#91001580)	Roughly bounded by Bertha St., Commerce St., Pierce Ave., 5th St., and Pulaski St. 37°02′31″N 80°47′06″W	Pulaski	
21	Rockwood	Rockwood	May 26, 2005 (#05000473)	5189 Rockwood Dr. 37°06′47″N 80°42′09″W	Dublin	
22	St. Albans Hospital	St. Albans Hospital	January 24, 2020 (#100004653)	6248 University Park Dr. 37°08′23″N 80°34′41″W	Fairlawn	
23	Snowville Christian Church	Snowville Christian Church	April 2, 1987 (#87000563)	Lead Mine Rd. 37°02′04″N 80°33′36″W	Snowville	
24	Snowville Historic District	Snowville Historic District	January 7, 1987 (#86003650)	Lead Mine Rd. 37°02′06″N 80°33′35″W	Snowville	
25	Spring Dale	Spring Dale	October 23, 2003 (#03001087)	Off Ruebush Rd., north of Dublin; 37°09′11″N 80°39′59″W	Dublin	

== Former listing ==
	Name on the Register	Image	Date listed	Date removed	Location	City or town	Description
1	Nathaniel Burwell Harvey House		February 13, 1986 (#86000250)	March 19, 2001	Off VA 812	Dublin	Demolished

== See also ==
- List of National Historic Landmarks in Virginia
- National Register of Historic Places listings in Virginia
- National Register of Historic Places listings in Radford, Virginia
