= Nathaniel Burwell Harvey House =

Historic house in Virginia, United States

- Formerly listed on the U.S. National Register of Historic Places
- Virginia Landmarks Register
- Location: Off VA 812, near Dublin, Virginia
- Built: 1909
- Built by: Chapman, James D.; Harvey, Nathaniel Burwell
- Architectural style: Colonial Revival
- NRHP reference No.: 86000250
- VLR No.: 077-0049

Significant dates
- Added to NRHP: February 13, 1986
- Designated VLR: October 15, 1985
- Removed from NRHP: March 19, 2001
- Delisted VLR: March 19, 1997

Nathaniel Burwell Harvey House was a historic home located near Dublin, Pulaski County, Virginia. It was built in 1909–1910, and was a 2 1/2-story, three-bay, Colonial Revival style brick dwelling on a limestone basement. It had a rear brick ell and hipped roof with dormers. The front facade featured a one-story porch with six Tuscan order columns. The interior had decorative stenciling by artist James D. Chapman.

It was added to the National Register of Historic Places in 1986; it was delisted in 2001.
