= 3rd Pennsylvania Reserve Regiment =

Union Army infantry regiment

- Pennsylvania flag
- Active: May 20, 1861, to June 17, 1864
- Country: United States
- Allegiance: Union
- Branch: Infantry
- Engagements: Battle of Mechanicsville; Battle of Gaines' Mill; Battle of Glendale; Battle of Malvern Hill; Battle of Second Bull Run; Battle of South Mountain; Battle of Antietam; Battle of Fredericksburg; Battle of Cloyd's Mountain; Battle of Winchester; Battle of Cedar Creek

The 3rd Pennsylvania Reserve Regiment, also known as the 32nd Pennsylvania Volunteer Infantry Regiment, was an infantry regiment that served in the Union Army during the American Civil War. It was part of the 2nd Brigade of the Pennsylvania Reserves division.

== Organization ==
Company	Moniker	Primary Location of Recruitment	Captains
A	The Second Reading Artillery	Berks County	Jacob Lenhart Jr.
B	The Salem Independents	Wayne County	William D. Curtis
C	The Union Rifles	Bucks County	David V. Feaster
D	The Mechanics's Infantry	Berks County	William Briner
E	The De Silver Greys	Philadelphia	John Clark
F	The Washington Guards	Berks County	Washington Richards
G	The Germantown Guards	Philadelphia	Richard H. Woolworth
H	The Applebachville Guards	Bucks County	Joseph Thomas
I	The Montgomery Guards	Bucks County	William S. Thompson
K	The Ontario Infantry	Philadelphia	Horatio G. Sickel

== Service ==
The 3rd Pennsylvania Reserves were raised at Philadelphia, Pennsylvania, on May 20, 1861. Horatio G. Sickel served as the regiment's first colonel, William S. Thompson as lieutenant colonel and Richard H. Woolworth as major. It was sent to Washington, D.C., where the division was assigned to the I Corps of the Army of the Potomac. The I Corps remained in northern Virginia instead of following the rest of the Army for the Peninsula Campaign in 1862. In May, due to Maj. Gen. George B. McClellan's demands for reinforcements, the division was sent the Peninsula as well. The 3rd performed well during the Seven Days Battles, but lost over one hundred men.

In August, the Army of the Potomac was transferred to northern Virginia to support the Army of Virginia. The 3rd Pennsylvania Reserves then fought at Turner's Gap in the Battle of South Mountain and at the Battle of Antietam. At the Battle of Fredericksburg on December 13, the 3rd formed part of the force which briefly broke through the Confederate right. It was among the last units to withdraw and suffered 128 casualties.

After Fredericksburg, the 3rd was assigned to the XXII Corps defending Washington, where it rested and recruited members. In January 1864, it was sent, along with the 4th Reserves, to West Virginia, where it performed garrison duty and fought at the Battle of Cloyd's Mountain. The regiment was mustered out on June 17, 1864, at Philadelphia. Men who reenlisted and those whose enlistments had not yet expired were transferred to the 54th Pennsylvania Volunteer Infantry on June 8, 1864.

== Casualties ==
The 3rd Pennsylvania Reserves suffered 3 Officers and 69 enlisted men killed in battle or died from wounds, and 1 officer and 54 enlisted men dead from disease, for a total of 127 fatalities.

== See also ==
- Pennsylvania Reserves
- Pennsylvania in the Civil War
