= Battle of Winfield, West Virginia =

Battle of the American Civil War

Battle of Winfield
- Part of the American Civil War
Date	October 26, 1864
Location	Winfield, Putnam County, West Virginia 38°32.034′N 81°53.544′W
Result	Union victory

Belligerents
United States (Union)	(Confederate States of America) Confederate States (Confederacy)

Commanders and leaders
(United States) Capt. John Reynolds	(Confederate States of America) Lt. Col. Vincent Witcher (Confederate States of America) Capt. Phillip Thurmond †

Units involved
Company D, 7th West Virginia Cavalry	Thurmond's Rangers, 44th Virginia Cavalry; 34th Virginia Cavalry Battalion

Strength
1 company, 83 men	2 columns, 425 men

Casualties and losses
None	Unknown killed and wounded Several captured

Lieutenant Colonel Vincent Witcher and Captain Phillip Thurmond led two columns of Confederates on October 26, 1864, against Federal troops protecting Winfield, the Putnam County Courthouse and local traffic on the Ohio River. Though outnumbered, Company D of the 7th West Virginia Cavalry under Captain John Reynolds repulsed the attack, killing Thurmond and taking several prisoners without suffering any major casualties.

Lt. Col. Witcher led the first column, consisting of men from the 34th Virginia Cavalry Battalion, and Capt. Thurmond led the second column, consisting of his own Thurmond's Rangers, which was organized as part of the 44th Virginia Cavalry.

== Background ==
Winfield's location along the Kanawha River made it an important hub for trade and commerce, and of strategic value during the war as a result. Control of this section of the riverfront enabled control of all steamboat traffic on the upper Kanawha.

Riding under the cover of darkness, a force of 425 Confederate troops approached the town, where they learned of the Union garrison's presence there.

Company D of the 7th West Virginia Cavalry had been ordered to Winfield primarily to protect steamboat traffic. A secondary role for Union troops was to guard the Putnam County Courthouse and town of Winfield from Confederate attack; not an unpopular task given the company's men were from Putnam and surrounding counties in West Virginia.
