= Pulaski South Historic Residential and Industrial District =

Historic district in Virginia, United States

- U.S. National Register of Historic Places
- U.S. Historic district
- Virginia Landmarks Register
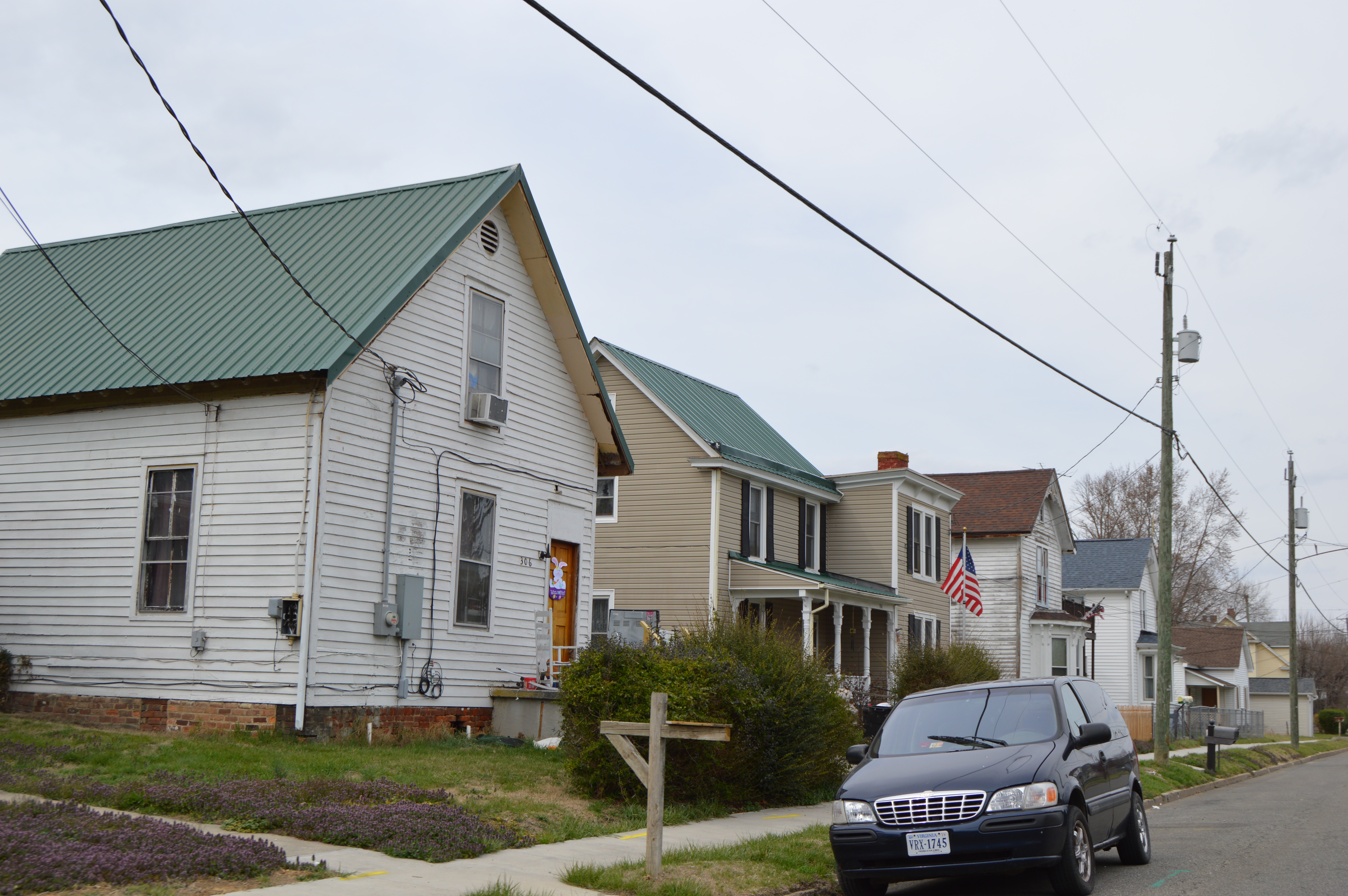
- Valley Street

- Location within Virginia Location within the United States
- Location: Roughly bounded by Bertha St., Commerce St., Pierce Ave., 5th St. and Pulaski St., Pulaski, Virginia
- Coordinates: 37°02′31″N 80°47′6″W
- Area: 112 acres (45 ha)
- Architectural style: Colonial Revival, Gothic, Queen Anne
- NRHP reference No.: 91001580
- VLR No.: 125-0008

Significant dates
- Added to NRHP: October 29, 1991
- Designated VLR: August 21, 1991

The Pulaski South Historic Residential and Industrial District encompasses an area of residential and industrial development on the south side of Pulaski, Virginia. Located south of Commerce Street, the town's early commercial district, is an area that was developed between about 1880 and 1940 to support the growth of the Bertha Zinc and Mineral Company, a major local employer of the period whose industrial complex lies just west of the district. The district includes tracts of modest worker housing, including brick rowhouses, and vernacular one and two-family frame houses. There are two churches, one a fine brick Gothic church for a Pentecostal congregation, the other an Episcopal church since converted into housing.

The district was listed on the National Register of Historic Places in 1991.

== See also ==
- National Register of Historic Places listings in Pulaski County, Virginia
