= 198th Pennsylvania Infantry Regiment =

Union Army infantry regiment

198th Pennsylvania Volunteer Infantry
- Active: September 9, 1864 – June 4, 1865
- Country: United States of America
- Allegiance: Union
- Branch: Infantry
- Engagements: Siege of Petersburg; Battle of Peebles' Farm; Battle of Boydton Plank Road; Battle of Hatcher's Run; Appomattox Campaign; Battle of Fort Stedman; Battle of Lewis's Farm; Battle of White Oak Road; Battle of Five Forks; Third Battle of Petersburg; Battle of Appomattox Court House

The 198th Pennsylvania Volunteer Infantry was an infantry regiment that served in the Union Army during the American Civil War.

== Service ==
The 198th Pennsylvania Infantry was organized at Philadelphia, Pennsylvania on September 9, 1864 and mustered in under the command of Colonel Horatio G. Sickel.

The regiment was attached to 1st Brigade, 1st Division, 5th Corps, Army of the Potomac.

The 198th Pennsylvania Infantry mustered out of service on June 4, 1865.

== Detailed service ==
Left Pennsylvania for Petersburg, Va., September 19, 1864. Siege of Petersburg September 1864 to April 1865. Poplar Springs Church September 29-October 2, 1864. Reconnaissance to Boydton Road October 8. Boydton Plank Road, Hatcher's Run, October 27–28. Warren's Raid to Weldon Railroad December 7–12. Dabney's Mills, Hatcher's Run, February 5–7, 1865. Appomattox Campaign March 28-April 9. Junction, Quaker and Boydton Roads March 29. Lewis's Farm near Gravelly Run March 29. White Oak Road March 30–31. Five Forks April 1. Appomattox Court House April 9. Surrender of Lee and his army. Marched to Washington, D.C., May 1–12. Grand Review of the Armies May 23.

== Casualties ==
The regiment lost a total of 117 men during service; 6 officers and 67 enlisted men killed or mortally wounded, 44 enlisted men died of disease.

== Commanders ==
- Colonel Horatio G. Sickel

== See also ==
- List of Pennsylvania Civil War Units
- Pennsylvania in the Civil War
