= 91st Ohio Infantry Regiment =

- Active: August 26, 1862, to June 24, 1865
- Country: United States
- Allegiance: Union
- Branch: Infantry
- Engagements: Battle of Cloyd's Mountain; Battle of Opequon; Battle of Cedar Creek

The 91st Ohio Infantry Regiment, sometimes 91st Ohio Volunteer Infantry Regiment was an infantry regiment that served in the Union Army during the American Civil War. It primarily served in what became West Virginia and in the Shenandoah Valley of Virginia.

== Service ==
The 91st Ohio was raised at Camp Ironton in south-central Ohio on August 26, 1862. After it was organized and mustered into Federal service in September, the regiment was moved by rail to western Virginia and assigned to the Department of the Kanawha, later to the VIII Corps under Brig. Gen. Eliakim Scammon. It participated in a series of raids and operations against Confederate positions in the region.

In the spring of 1864, the 91st Ohio fought in the Battle of Cloyd's Mountain in Pulaski County, Virginia, during Maj. Gen. George Crook's expedition to disrupt the Virginia & Tennessee Railroad, an important Confederate supply line. Later that year, it fought in the Battle of Piedmont and participated in the Valley Campaigns of 1864, including the battles of Berryville, Opequon or Third Winchester, Fisher's Hill, and Cedar Creek. During the remainder of the war, the regiment divided its time between garrison duty at Cumberland, Maryland, and Winchester, Virginia. The 91st Ohio Regiment was mustered out at Cumblerland on June 24, 1865, and transported by train back to Ohio.

During its time of service, the regiment lost 3 Officers and 60 enlisted men killed and mortally wounded, and another 3 Officers and 87 enlisted died of disease, making a loss of 153 soldiers.

== Commanders ==
- Colonel John Alexander Turley
- Colonel Benjamin F. Coates

== See also ==
- Ohio in the Civil War
