= 36th Ohio Infantry Regiment =

- Active: July 30, 1862, to July 27, 1865
- Country: United States
- Allegiance: Union
- Branch: Union Army
- Type: Infantry
- Equipment: Rifled muskets
- Engagements: American Civil War: Lewisburg; Second Bull Run; South Mountain; Antietam; Chickamauga; Brown's Ferry; Missionary Ridge; Cloyd's Mountain; Second Kernstown; Berryville; Opequon; Fisher's Hill; Cedar Creek

The 36th Ohio Infantry Regiment was an infantry regiment that served in the Union Army during the American Civil War. Recruited from several counties in southeastern Ohio, the regiment participated in several battles in the Eastern Theater before being transferred for a period to the Western Theater. In 1864, it returned to the East and participated in the Valley Campaigns of 1864.

== Service ==
The 36th Regiment, Ohio Volunteer Infantry, was raised at Marietta, Ohio, between July 30 and August 31, 1861. After training and drilling, the new regiment moved to Summersville, Virginia, in what is now West Virginia, on September 10. It engaged in several raids and operations in the region and helped win a decisive victory at the Battle of Lewisburg. In August 1862, the regiment moved into the defenses of Washington, D.C. Shortly thereafter, the 36th participated in the Northern Virginia Campaign and in the Second Battle of Bull Run. During the subsequent Maryland Campaign, the 36th, as part of the Army of the Potomac, attacked Confederate forces on South Mountain and then took part in the Battle of Antietam on September 17.

In 1863, the 36th Ohio moved to Eastern Tennessee and participated in several actions, including the Battle of Hoover's Gap and smaller engagements near the Cumberland Gap. It then fought at Chickamauga in northern Georgia in September. It also was in action during the Chattanooga Campaign (Brown's Ferry and Missionary Ridge).

When the regiment's term of enlistment expired late in the year, a majority of the men voted to re-enlist in January 1864 earning the unit the title of Veteran Volunteer Infantry. They were part of an expedition, led by Brigadier General Crook (formerly commander of the 36th Ohio), against the Virginia & Tennessee Railroad in early May. The regiment fought in the Battle of Cloyd's Mountain and in other smaller engagements in the region (Lynchburg), as well as participating in many of the battles of the Valley Campaigns of 1864 (Second Kernstown, Berryville, Opequon, Fisher's Hill, Cedar Creek).

The regiment was mustered out on July 27, 1865, at Wheeling, West Virginia.

The 36th Ohio suffered 4 officers and 136 enlisted men killed in battle or died of wounds, and 163 enlisted men dead from disease, for a total of 303 fatalities.

== Commanders ==
- Colonel George R. Crook - promoted to brigadier general, September 7, 1862
- Colonel Melvin C. Clark - killed at the Battle of Antietam, September 17, 1862
- Colonel Ebenezer B. Andrews - resigned, April 9, 1863
- Colonel William G. Jones - killed at the Battle of Chickamauga, September 19, 1863
- Colonel Hiram F. Duval - mustered out with regiment, July 27, 1865; brevet brigadier general, July 30, 1865

== See also ==
- 36th OVI Website by Leslie Lienert
- 36th OVI Page by Larry Stevens
- Ohio in the Civil War
