= 7th West Virginia Cavalry Regiment =

- Flag of West Virginia
- Active: January 26, 1864, to August 1, 1865
- Country: United States
- Allegiance: Union
- Branch: Cavalry
- Engagements: Cross Keys (infantry); Second Bull Run (infantry); White Sulphur Springs (mtd infantry); Droop Mountain (mtd infantry); Cloyd's Mountain (cav det); Winfield (Co. D only); Battle of Lynchburg

The 7th West Virginia Cavalry Regiment was a cavalry regiment that served in the Union Army during the American Civil War. It was originally organized as the 8th West Virginia Infantry Regiment during late 1861. The regiment became a mounted infantry during June 1863, and became the 7th West Virginia Cavalry on January 26, 1864.

== Service ==
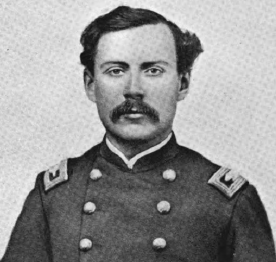
Col. John H. Oley

The 7th West Virginia Cavalry Regiment was organized from the 8th West Virginia Volunteer Infantry Regiment on January 26, 1864, which was recruited from the central and southern counties of Braxton, Clay, Jackson, Kanawha, Putnam, Raleigh, Fayette, Boone, Logan and Wyoming.

The 7th West Virginia Cavalry Regiment mustered out on August 1, 1865.

== Commanders ==
- Colonel John H. Oley

== Notes ==
=== References ===
- Dyer, Frederick H. (1908). A Compendium of the War of the Rebellion. Des Moines, Iowa: Dyer Pub. Co. OCLC 1028851810.
- Lang, Joseph J. (1895). Loyal West Virginia from 1861 to 1865 : With an Introductory Chapter on the Status of Virginia for Thirty Years Prior to the War. Baltimore, MD: Deutsch Publishing Co. OCLC 779093.
- Snell, Mark A. (2011). West Virginia and the Civil War : Mountaineers are Always Free. Charleston, SC: History Press. ISBN 978-1-61423-390-9. OCLC 829025932.
- Union Army (1908). The Union Army, Vol. 2: A History of Military Affairs in the Loyal States 1861-65, Records of the Regiments in the Union Army, Cyclopedia of Battles, Memoirs of Commanders and Soldiers; New York, Maryland, West Virginia and Ohio. Madison, Wisconsin: Federal Publishing Company.

== See also ==
- West Virginia Units in the Civil War
- West Virginia in the Civil War
