= Belle–Hampton =

Historic house in Virginia, United States

- U.S. National Register of Historic Places
- Virginia Landmarks Register
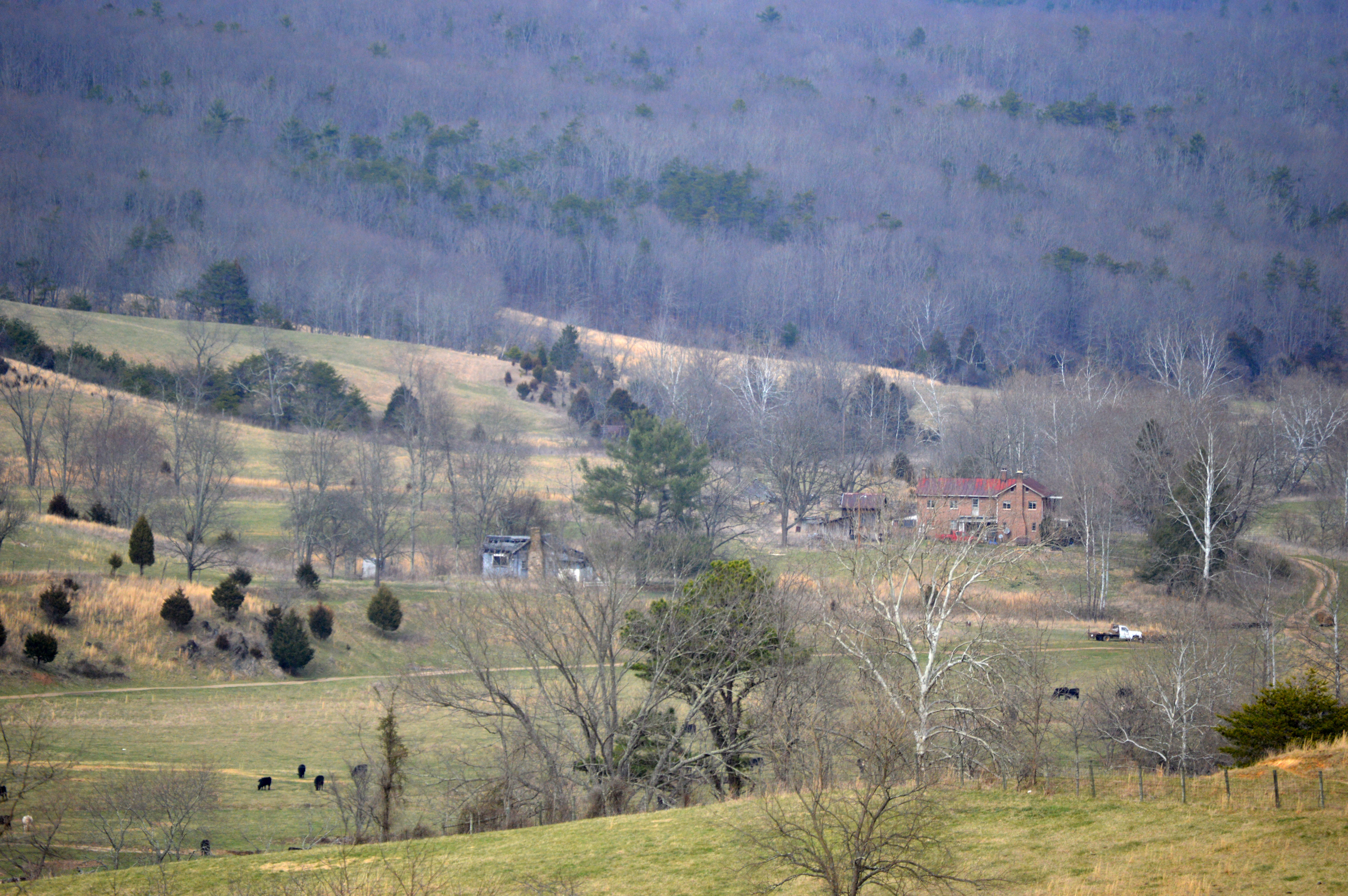
- Distant view from the south

- Location within Virginia Location within the United States
- Location: VA 627, 0.3 mi. N of VA 617, near Dublin, Virginia
- Coordinates: 37°10′45″N 80°39′44″W
- Area: 253 acres (102 ha)
- Built: c. 1826, c. 1879
- Architectural style: Italianate, Federal
- NRHP reference No.: 89001911
- VLR No.: 077-0003

Significant dates
- Added to NRHP: November 13, 1989
- Designated VLR: April 18, 1989

Belle–Hampton, also known as Hayfield, is a historic home located near Dublin, Pulaski County, Virginia. It is a two-story, brick dwelling that consists of two sections. The original section was built about 1826, and is the two-story, three room rear section, with a large two-story two-room addition built about 1879, and obscuring the original front. The house exhibits Federal and Italianate style decorative elements. Among the contributing buildings and structures are a 1931 swimming pool and tennis court; a probable kitchen/ washhouse / slave dwelling, barn, granary, and a meathouse that date to the 19th century. The property also includes the site of a private coal-mining operation with a well-preserved commissary building and blacksmith shop. The property was the home, farm and industrial operation of James Hoge Tyler, industrialist, agricultural and industrial promoter, and governor of Virginia from 1898 to 1902.

It was added to the National Register of Historic Places in 1989.
