= 45th Virginia Infantry Battalion =

- Virginia flag (1861 design)
- Active: 1863–1865
- Disbanded: April 1865
- Country: Confederate States
- Allegiance: Virginia
- Branch: Confederate States Army
- Type: Infantry
- Size: Battalion
- Nickname(s): "Beckley's battalion"
- Facings: Light blue
- Engagements: American Civil War: Battle of Cloyd's Mountain; Battle of Cedar Creek; Battle of Waynesboro

Commanders
- Commanding officer: Lieut. Col. Henry M. Beckley

The 45th Virginia Infantry Battalion (also known as "Beckley's battalion") was formed in detachments throughout southern West Virginia, Logan, Wayne, Wyoming, and Boone counties, from April to December 1863 until it reached six companies with 287 men. Most men who joined the newly formed infantry unit had previously served with Lieutenant Colonel Henry M. Beckley in the 1st Regiment of the Virginia State Line, a unit that had disbanded that January.

The battalion and its detachments engaged in many skirmishes while serving with the Department of Western Virginia before becoming engaged at the Battle of Cloyd's Mountain where the battalion's strength was reported as 183 officers and men, suffering four killed and eleven wounded. With the rest of Colonel John McCausland's forces the Forty-Fifth was engaged along the New River before turning east to fight at the Battle of Piedmont with 175 men and the rest of the Valley Campaigns of 1864. Like most other units of Early's army, the 45th Battalion surrendered after the defeat at Waynesboro.

== See also ==
- List of Virginia Civil War units
- List of West Virginia Civil War Confederate units
