= Haven B. Howe House =

Historic house in Virginia, United States

- U.S. National Register of Historic Places
- Virginia Landmarks Register
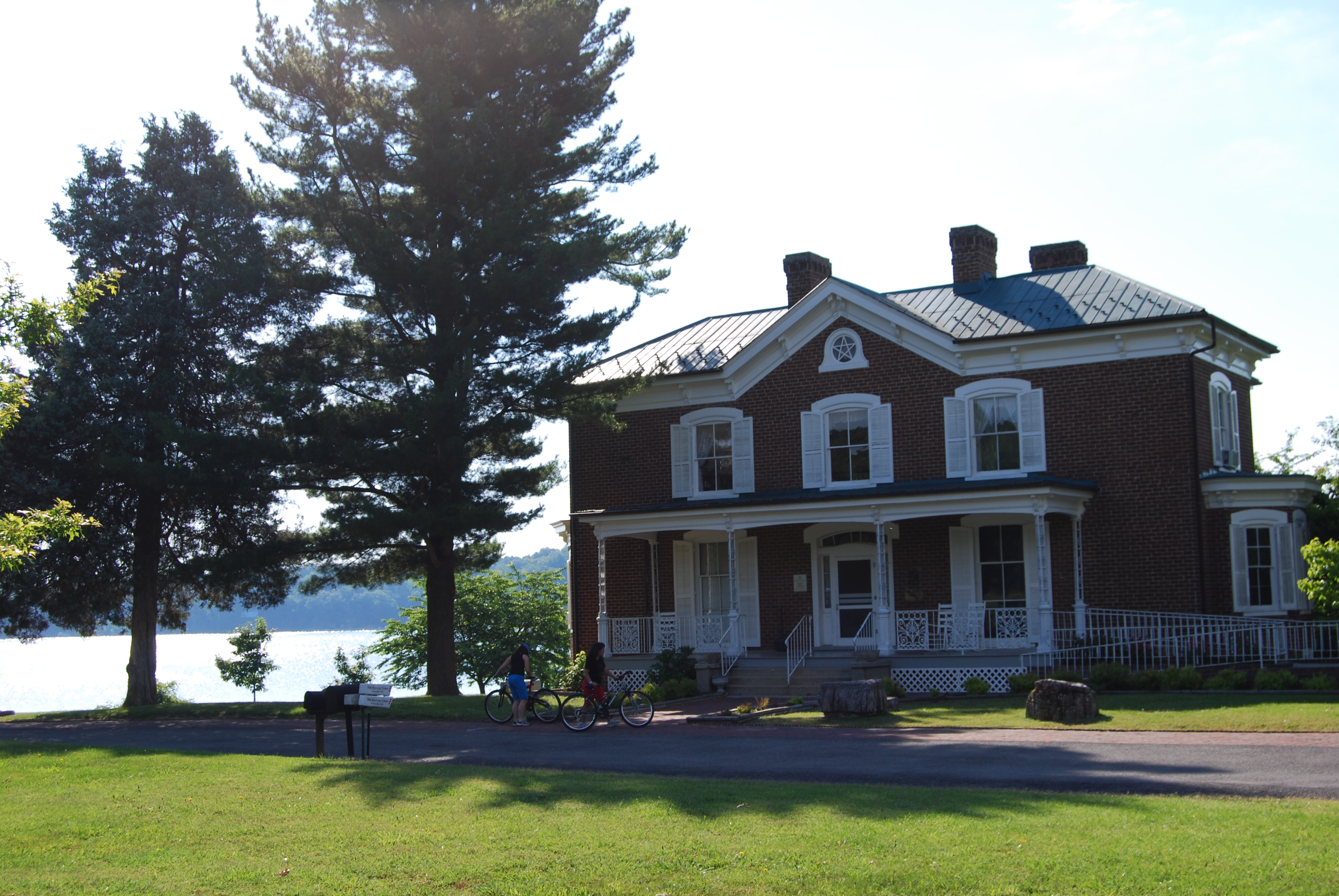
- Haven B. Howe House

- Location within Virginia Location within the United States
- Location: 4400 State Park Rd., Dublin, Virginia
- Coordinates: 37°05′18″N 80°39′02″W
- Area: 4 acres (1.6 ha)
- Built: 1876-1879
- Architectural style: Italianate
- NRHP reference No.: 08000321
- VLR No.: 077-0047

Significant dates
- Added to NRHP: April 15, 2008
- Designated VLR: June 1, 2005

Haven B. Howe House is a historic home located at Claytor Lake State Park, near Dublin, Pulaski County, Virginia. It was built between 1876 and 1879, and is a two-story, brick dwelling with Italianate-style detailing. It has a rear brick ell and projecting one-story bays on both end walls. It features ornamental wrought iron porch supports. Also on the property are three contributing limestone mounting blocks. The property, located on Claytor Lake, was conveyed to the Virginia Conservation Commission in 1947. The house is used as a Nature Exhibit Center that focuses on the lake's wildlife habitat.

It was added to the National Register of Historic Places in 2008.
