= 60th Virginia Infantry Regiment =

- Flag of Virginia, 1861
- Active: August 1861 – April 1865
- Disbanded: April 1865
- Country: Confederacy
- Allegiance: Confederate States of America
- Branch: Confederate States Army
- Type: Infantry
- Engagements: American Civil War: Seven Days' Battles; Battle of Piedmont; Battle of Cloyd's Mountain; Valley Campaigns of 1864; Battle of Waynesboro, Virginia

The 60th Virginia Infantry Regiment was an infantry regiment raised in Virginia for service in the Confederate States Army during the American Civil War. It fought mostly with the Army of Northern Virginia and in Tennessee.

The 60th Virginia (also called 3rd Regiment, Wise Legion) was organized in August 1861. The unit served in Field's, McCausland's, and T. Smith's Brigade. It fought in the Seven Days' Battles and reported 31 killed and 173 wounded. Later it was attached to the Department of Western Virginia and East Tennessee and participated in numerous conflicts including the fight at Piedmont. The 60th took part in Early's operations in the Shenandoah Valley and fought its last battle at Waynesboro. During mid-April, 1865, it disbanded.

Co. A Beirne Sharpshooters (Monroe County)

Co. B. Greenbrier Mountain Rifles (Greenbrier County)

Co. C Dixie Rifles (formerly Jackson Avengers) (Fayette County)

Co. D Alleghany Rifles (Alleghany County)

Co. E Bruce Rifles (Greenbrier County)

Co. F James River Rifles (Fauquier County & Braxton County)

Co. G Roane Rangers (Roane County)

Co. H (1st) Richmond Light Guards (Richmond County)

Co. H (2nd) Capt. John A. Pack's Co. (Mecer County)

Co. I Capt. White's Co. (Mercer County)

Co. K Osceola Guards (Botetourt County)

The field officers were Colonels Beuhring H. Jones and William H. Starke; Lieutenant Colonels James L. Corley, William A. Gilliam, George W. Hammond, J.W. Spaulding, John C. Summers, and W.A. Swank; and Majors William S. Rowan, James W. Sweeney, and Jacob N. Taylor. The last officer to command the unit on the field of battle was Acting Major John L. Caynor who was captured with much of the unit at the Battle of Waynesboro on March 2, 1865.

== See also ==
- List of Virginia Civil War units
- List of West Virginia Civil War Confederate units
