= Rockwood (Dublin, Virginia) =

Historic house in Virginia, United States

- U.S. National Register of Historic Places
- Virginia Landmarks Register
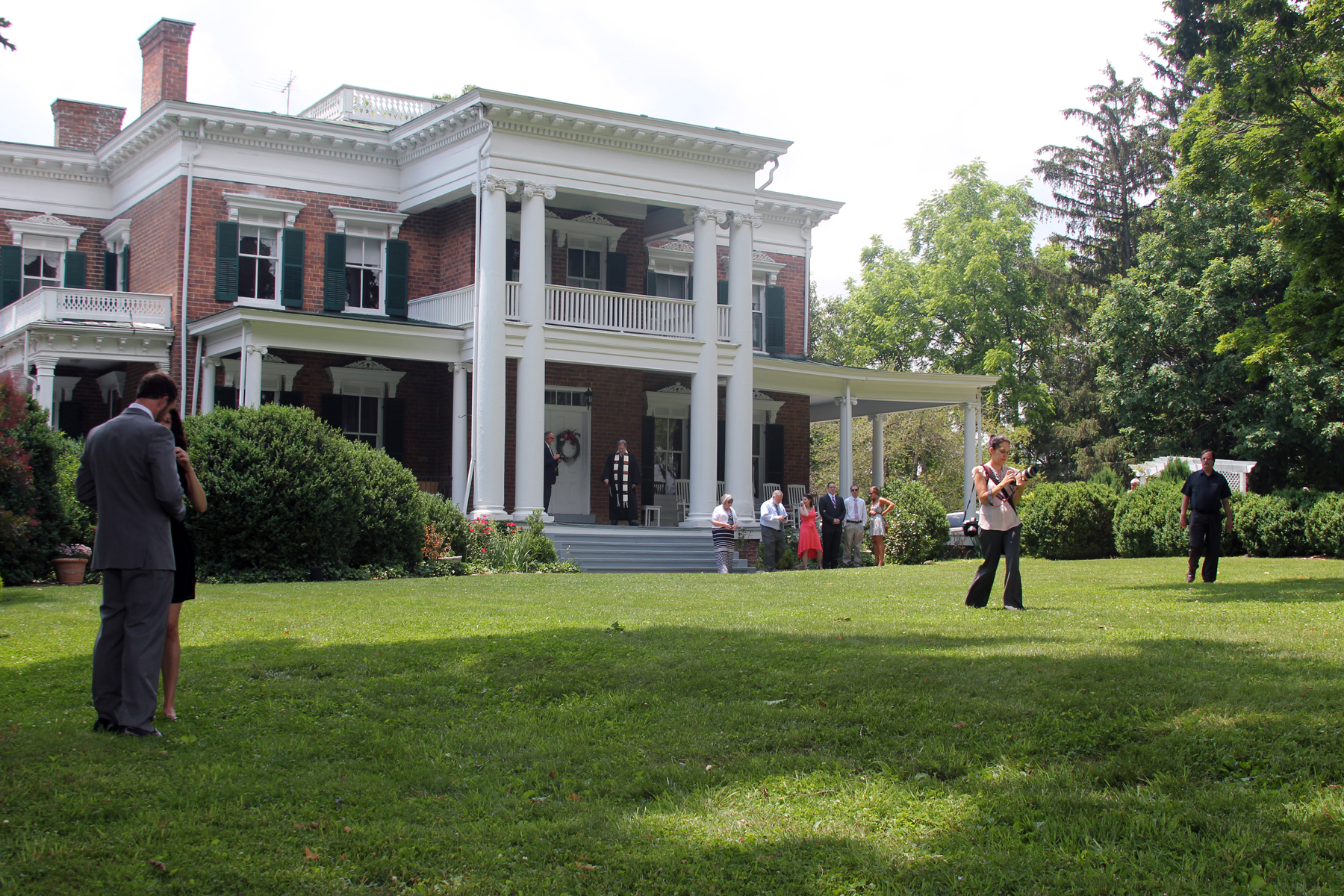

- Location within Virginia Location within the United States
- Location: 5189 Rockwood Dr., Dublin, Virginia
- Coordinates: 37°06′50″N 80°42′09″W
- Area: 68 acres (28 ha)
- Built: 1874-1875
- Architect: Multiple
- Architectural style: Greek Revival, Classical Revival
- NRHP reference No.: 05000473
- VLR No.: 077-0045

Significant dates
- Added to NRHP: May 26, 2005
- Designated VLR: March 16, 2005

Rockwood is a historic home and cattle / dairy farm located near Dublin, Pulaski County, Virginia. It was built in 1874–1875, and is a large two-story, Greek Revival style brick dwelling. It has a metal-sheathed hipped roof with a deck, interior brick chimneys, two-story semi-octagonal bay windows, ornamental metal lintels, and a Classical Revival wraparound porch added in the 1910s. The center section of the porch rises a full two stories on monumental Ionic order columns. Also on the property are the contributing smokehouse (1870s), garage, ice house site, two chicken houses, pump house, gate pillars, lamb barn, spring house, dairy barn, calf barn, mill house, two pump houses, bull barn, and a corn crib and wagon shed. Many of the contributing outbuildings date to the 1950s.

It was added to the National Register of Historic Places in 2005.
