= Fairview District Home =

- U.S. National Register of Historic Places
- Virginia Landmarks Register
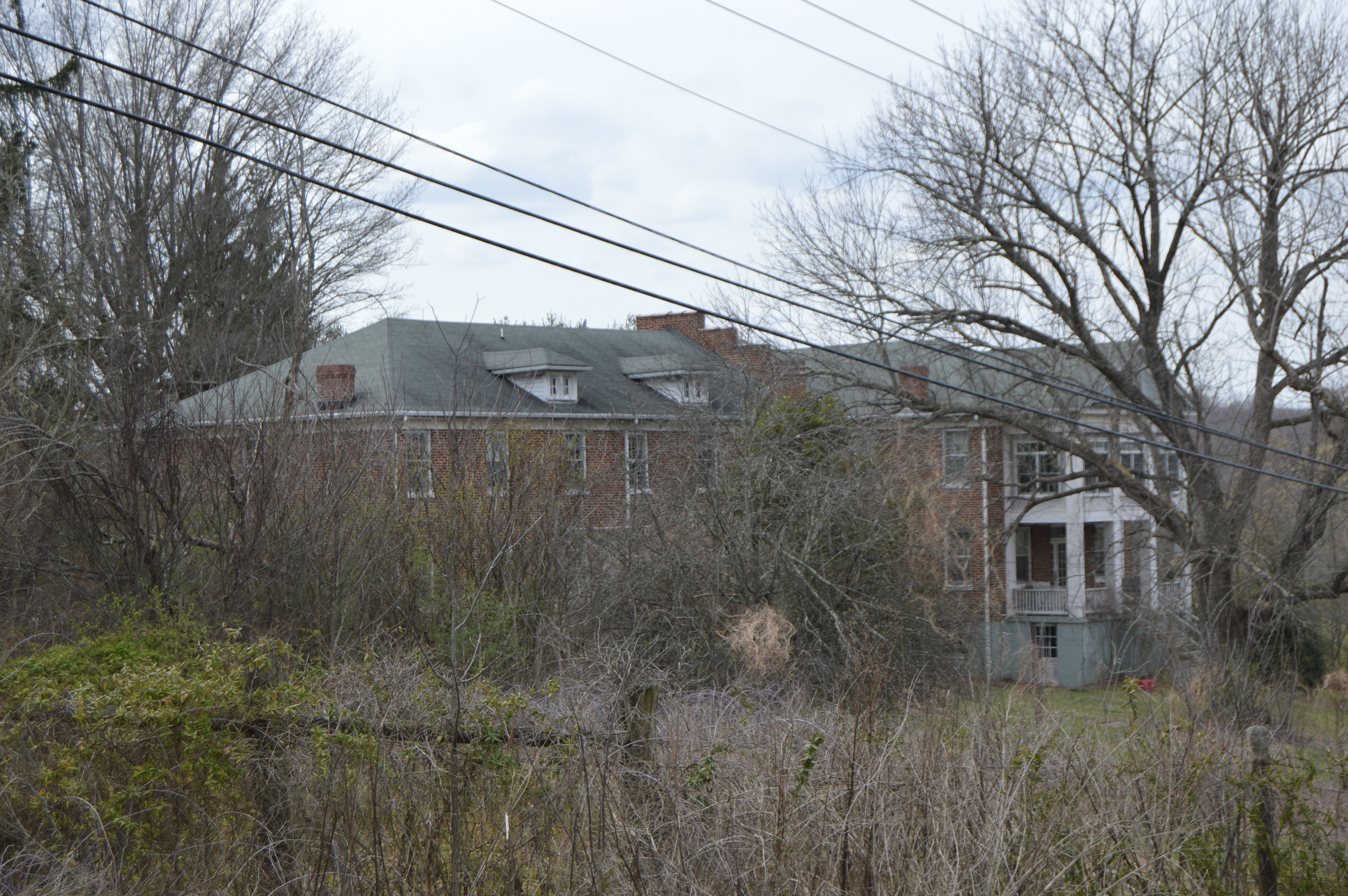
- Front and eastern side

- Location within Virginia Location within the United States
- Location: Roughly bounded by VA 643, Virginia 11, and VA 100, near Dublin, Virginia
- Coordinates: 37°5′43″N 80°43′10″W
- Area: 1 acre (0.40 ha)
- Built: 1928
- Architect: Clarence Henry Hinnant
- Architectural style: Colonial Revival
- NRHP reference No.: 97001073
- VLR No.: 077-5032

Significant dates
- Added to NRHP: August 29, 1997
- Designated VLR: July 2, 1997

Fairview District Home is a historic almshouse located near Dublin, Pulaski County, Virginia. It was built in 1928, and is large, two-story, T-shaped brick Colonial Revival style building. The front facade features a projecting, three-bay, central pavilion with a large pedimented porch. Also on the property is a contributing two-story, brick garage. The Fairview District Home was established to serve the counties of Craig, Giles, Montgomery, Pulaski, Roanoke, and Smyth, as well as the city of Radford, as part of a Governor Harry F. Byrd-era reform of the county almshouse system in Virginia. In the mid-1970s the Fairview Home moved to a modern building on the property and continued to operate as a nursing home.

It was added to the National Register of Historic Places in 1997.
