= Horatio G. Sickel =

American Union Army officer

Horatio Gates Sickel
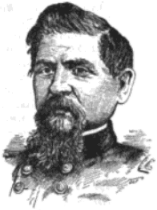
- Born: April 3, 1817; Bucks County, Pennsylvania
- Died: April 17, 1890 (aged 73); Philadelphia, Pennsylvania
- Burial place: Doylestown Cemetery, Doylestown, Pennsylvania
- Military career
- Allegiance: United States of America; Union
- Branch: United States Army; Union Army
- Service years: 1861–1865
- Rank: Colonel, U.S.V. Brevet Major General, U.S.V.
- Commands: 3rd Pennsylvania Reserve Regiment; 198th Pennsylvania Infantry; 3rd Brigade, Kanawha Division; 1st Bde, 1st Div, V Corps
- Conflicts: American Civil War: Peninsula Campaign; Second Battle of Bull Run; Battle of Fredericksburg; Battle of Cloyd's Mountain; Battle of Poplar Springs Church; Battle of Hatcher's Run; Battle of Quaker Road
- Other work: coach maker, lamp manufacturer, U.S. Pension agent, railroad executive

Horatio Gates Sickel (April 3, 1817 – April 17, 1890) was a Union Army officer during the American Civil War. He served in the Pennsylvania Reserves during the first part of the war and later commanded brigades in western Virginia and at Petersburg, where a serious wound ended his military career.

== Early life ==
Sickel was born April 3, 1817, in Bucks County, Pennsylvania. He belonged to a family of Dutch settlers who had emigrated to the area with William Penn. He was also distantly related to Revolutionary War general, Horatio Gates, from whom he received his namesake. Sickel spent his early life as an apprentice in coach making and manufacturing lamps. He served as a captain in the state militia prior to the war.

== Civil War ==
In 1861 Sickel volunteered for the Union army and was appointed captain (May 27) then colonel (July 28) of the 3rd Pennsylvania Reserves. Sickel and his regiment joined the Army of the Potomac on the Virginia Peninsula in time for the Seven Days Battles. He led his regiment credibly at Mechanicsville and Gaines' Mill, receiving commendations from his brigade and division commanders, George G. Meade and George McCall. He continued in command of the regiment through the battles of Second Bull Run and Fredericksburg. Shortly after Fredericksburg, he succeeded Meade in command of the Pennsylvania Reserve Division. Sickel and his division were stationed at Alexandria, Virginia, on guard duty. While many of the Pennsylvania Reserves rejoined the Army of the Potomac for the Gettysburg campaign, Sickel stayed behind as commander of a brigade in the Department of Alexandria.

Sickel did not see action again until the Spring of 1864 when he was ordered to join the forces of George Crook operating in western Virginia, where he commanded the 3rd Brigade of Crook's Kanawha Division. At the Battle of Cloyd's Mountain, he led his men in a charge against the Confederate breastworks, which succeeded in turning the enemy's flank. The following month, the three-year enlistments of the 3rd Pennsylvania Reserves ran out. Sickel and the rest of his men were mustered out of the volunteer services on June 17, 1864. He immediately reenlisted and was appointed colonel of the 198th Pennsylvania Infantry. This command was ordered to the Petersburg front and upon arrival there, Sickel was placed in command of the 1st Brigade in the 1st Division of the V Corps. Two weeks later, Sickel led his brigade into action at Poplar Springs Church. For his services there, he was given a brevet promotion to brigadier general of volunteers on October 21, 1864. Sickel took a supporting role in the Battle of Boydton Plank Road but was again significantly engaged at Hatcher's Run. There, he received a painful flesh wound in his left thigh on February 6, 1865. This wound bothered him for the remainder of his life. In November 1864, General Joshua L. Chamberlain, permanent commander of the 1st Brigade, returned to duty, and Sickel reverted to regimental command. He was given a brevet promotion to major general on March 13, 1865. At the Battle of Quaker Road, Sickel "greatly distinguished himself", according to Chamberlain, "...and [behaved] in the most admirable manner." He was again wounded at Quaker Road, having his horse shot out from under him. While it was believed at the time that his arm would have to be amputated, his arm was saved, but he lost his elbow. He mustered out of the volunteer service on June 4, 1865.

== Later life ==
Upon his return to Pennsylvania, Sickel was appointed Health Inspector for the Port of Philadelphia. He also served as an I.R.S. collector and pension agent, as well as the president of the Philadelphia, Newton & New York Railroad.

Sickel died April 17, 1890, in Philadelphia and is buried in Doylestown Cemetery.

== See also ==
- List of American Civil War brevet generals
