= Dublin Historic District =

Historic district in Virginia, United States

- U.S. National Register of Historic Places
- U.S. Historic district
- Virginia Landmarks Register
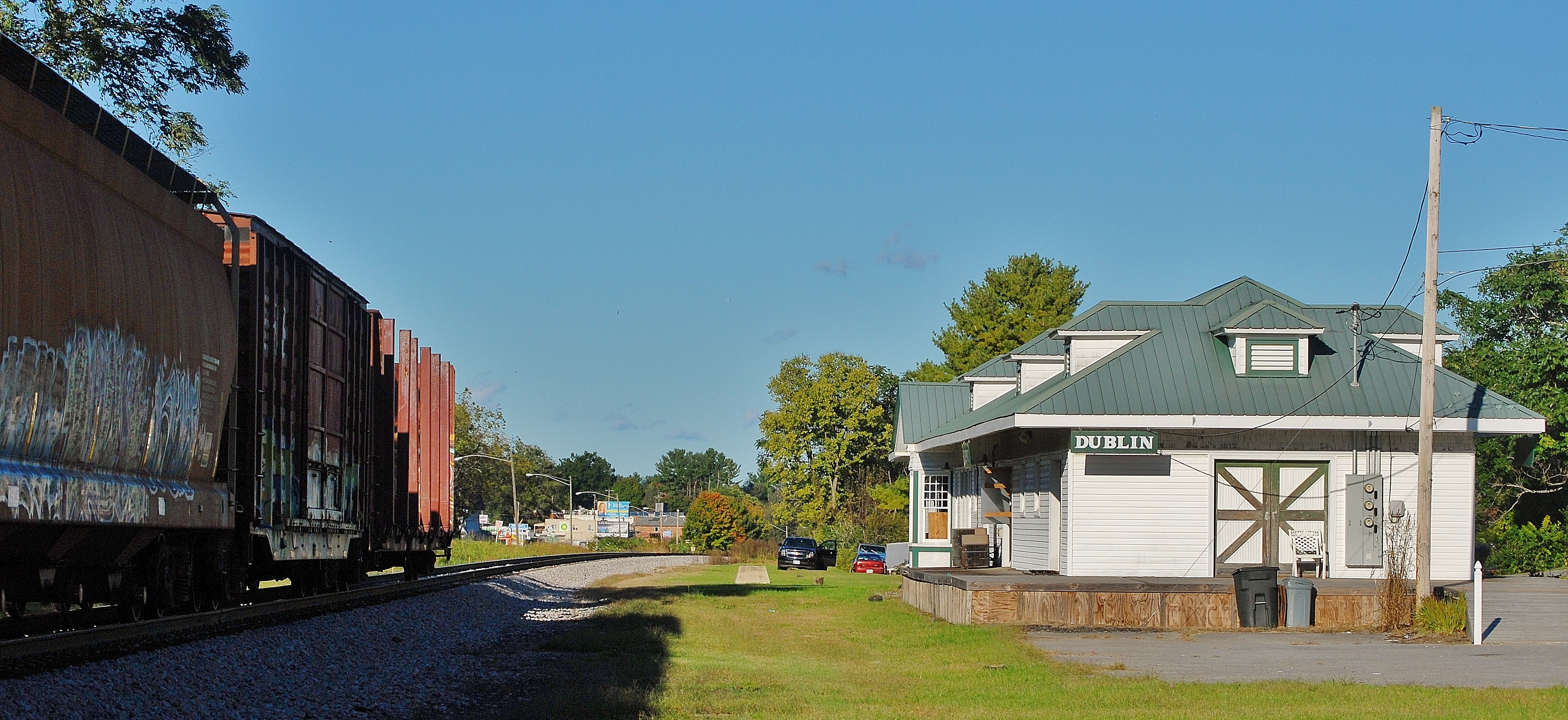

- Location within Virginia Location within the United States
- Location: Roughly, Giles Ave. from Long to Main Sts., Church St. from Giles to Linkous Ave. and E. Main from Giles to Ziegler St., Dublin, Virginia
- Coordinates: 37°06′25″N 80°41′07″W
- Area: 90 acres (36 ha)
- Built: 1854; 172 years ago
- Architect: Trinkle, L.L.; Dobyns, R.A.
- Architectural style: Late 19th And Early 20th Century American Movements, Late 19th And 20th Century Revivals, Late Victorian
- NRHP reference No.: 92001369
- VLR No.: 210-0004

Significant dates
- Added to NRHP: October 15, 1992
- Designated VLR: June 17, 1992

Dublin Historic District is a national historic district located at Dublin, Pulaski County, Virginia. It encompasses 97 contributing buildings in the town of Dublin. It includes a variety of residential, commercial, and institutional buildings dated as early as the mid-19th century. Notable buildings include the Sutton House, Norfolk and Western Railroad Depot (1913), Bower Funeral Service, Baskerville-St.Clair House, Darst Building (1871), Bank of Pulaski County, McCorkle House (1878), Dublin Presbyterian Church, Dublin Methodist Church (1875), Grace Baptist Church, and the Municipal Building.

It was added to the National Register of Historic Places in 1992.
