= 1st Ohio Independent Light Artillery Battery =

- Active: August 6, 1861, to June 26, 1865
- Country: United States
- Allegiance: Union
- Branch: Artillery
- Engagements: Battle of Carnifex Ferry; Maryland Campaign; Battle of South Mountain; Battle of Antietam; Battle of Cloyd's Mountain; Second Battle of Kernstown

1st Ohio Independent Light Artillery Battery was an artillery battery that served in the Union Army during the American Civil War.

== Service ==
The 1st Ohio Battery was organized at Camp Chase in Columbus, Ohio and mustered in for three years service on August 6, 1861, under Captain James Ross McMullin.

The battery was attached to Cox's Brigade, District of the Kanawha, West Virginia, to September 1861. Benham's Brigade, District of the Kanawha, West Virginia, to October 1861. 1st Brigade, District of the Kanawha, West Virginia, to March 1862. 1st Brigade, Kanawha Division, West Virginia, to August 1862. 1st Brigade, Kanawha Division, IX Corps, Army of the Potomac, to October 1862. 3rd Brigade, Kanawha Division, West Virginia, Department of the Ohio, to March 1863. 2nd Brigade, 3rd Division, VIII Corps, Middle Department, to June 1863. 2nd Brigade, Scammon's Division, Army of West Virginia, to December 1863. 2nd Brigade, 3rd Division, Army of West Virginia, to April 1864. Artillery, 2nd Infantry Division, Army of West Virginia, to July 1864. Artillery Brigade, Army of West Virginia, to August 1864. Artillery Reserve Division, Harpers Ferry, West Virginia, to April 1865. 3rd Brigade, Hardins' Division, XXII Corps, Defenses of Washington, to June 1865.

The 1st Ohio Battery mustered out of service June 26, 1865, at Columbus, Ohio.

== Detailed service ==
Ordered to the Kanawha Valley, Va. Action at Carnifex Ferry, Va., September 10, 1861. Moved to Camp Anderson and Big Sewell Mountain September 15–23, then to Camp Anderson October 6–9. Operations in the Kanawha Valley and New River Region October 19-November 16. Moved to Gauley and duty there until May 1862. Advance on Virginia & Tennessee Railroad April 22-May 1. Princeton May 11, 16 and 17. At Flat Top Mountain until August. Movement to Washington, D.C., August 15–24. Maryland Campaign September 6–22. Battles of South Mountain September 14; Antietam September 16–17. Moved to Clear Springs October 8, then to Hancock and march to the Kanawha Valley, W. Va., October 9-November 17, via Clarksburg, Summerville, Gauley Bridge, and Kanawha Falls. Duty at Kanawha Falls (Falls of the Great Kanawha) until March 1863, and at Charleston until April 1864. Fayetteville May 17–20, 1863 (section). Operations against Morgan's Raid in Ohio July 2–26, 1863. Scammon's Demonstration from Kanawha Valley December 8–25. Lewisburg and Greenbrier River December 12, 1863. Crook's Raid on Virginia & Tennessee Railroad May 3–19, 1864. Battle of Cloyd's Mountain May 9. New River Bridge May 10. Salt Pond Gap, Pond Mountain Gap, May 13. Hunter's Expedition to Lynchburg May 26-July 1. Lexington June 11. Diamond Hill June 17. Lynchburg June 17–18. Buford's Gap June 20. Salem June 21. Moved to Shenandoah Valley July 12–15. Action at Bunker Hill July 19. Stephenson's Depot, Carter's Farm, July 20. Battle of Winchester July 24. Retreat to Williamsport, Md.; then ordered to Martinsburg, W. Va., and duty there guarding stores until March 1865. Moved to Harpers Ferry, then to Washington, D.C., and duty in the defenses of that city until June.

== Casualties ==
The battery lost a total of 22 men during service; 1 officer and 6 enlisted men killed or mortally wounded, 15 enlisted men died of disease.

== Commanders ==
- Captain James Ross McMullin

== Legacy ==
- The Columbus Blue Jackets hockey team supporter club has adopted the name of 1st Ohio Battery.

== See also ==
- List of Ohio Civil War units
- Ohio in the Civil War
