= Spring Dale (Dublin, Virginia) =

Archaeological site in Virginia, United States

- U.S. National Register of Historic Places
- U.S. Historic district
- Virginia Landmarks Register
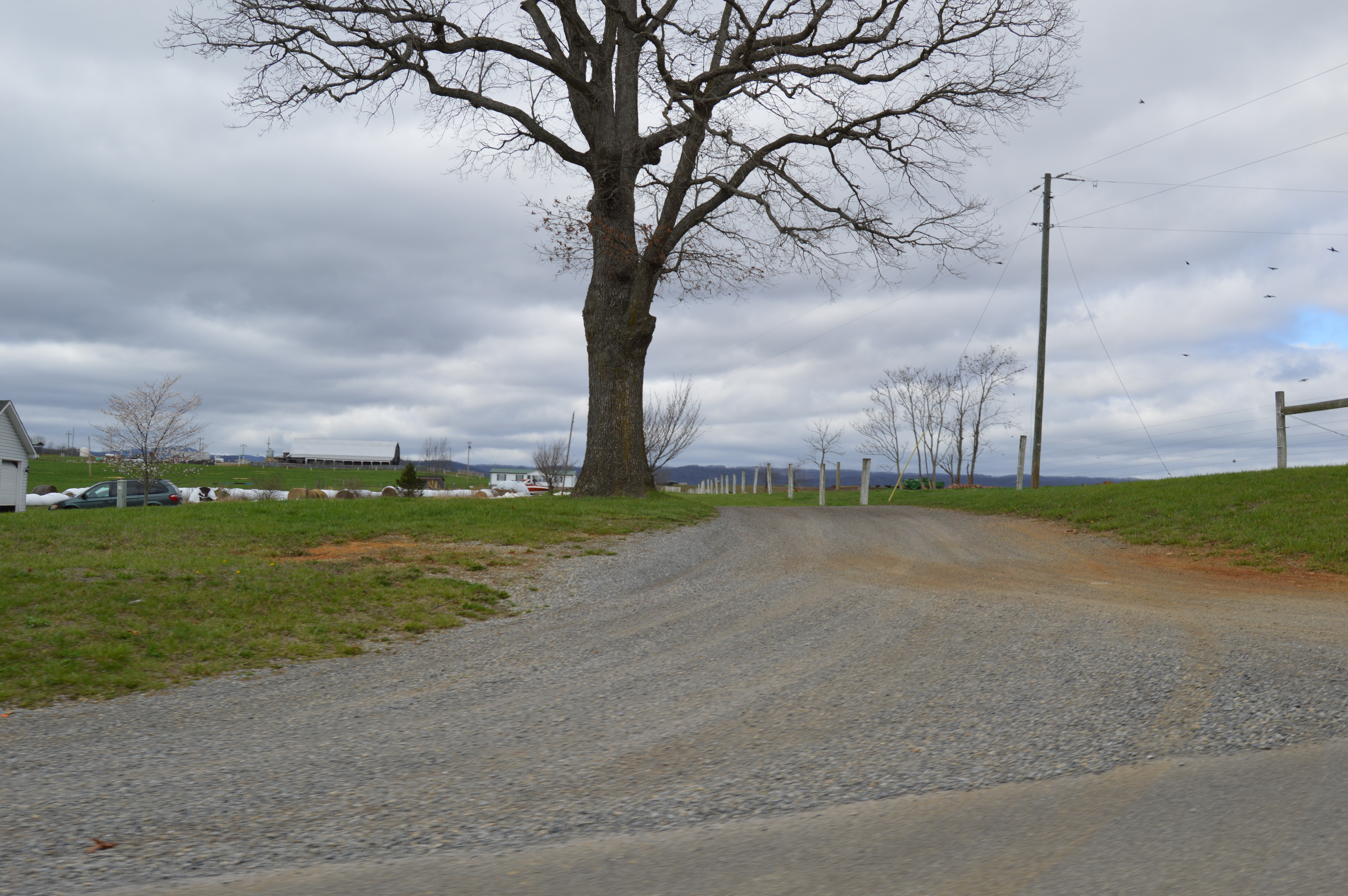
- Ruebush Road entrance

- Location within Virginia Location within the United States
- Location: Off Ruebush Rd., north of Dublin, Virginia
- Coordinates: 37°09′6″N 80°40′01″W
- Area: 106.6 acres (43.1 ha)
- Built: 1768, 1856-1857
- Built by: James Crawford Deyerle
- Architectural style: Gothic Revival
- NRHP reference No.: 03001087
- VLR No.: 077-0033

Significant dates
- Added to NRHP: October 23, 2003
- Designated VLR: June 18, 2003

Spring Dale, also known as Springdale and David S. McGavock House, is a historic home and national historic district located near Dublin, Pulaski County, Virginia. It encompasses five contributing buildings and the Samuel Cecil Archeological Site. The main house was built in 1856–1857, and is a two-story, nearly square, Gothic Revival style brick mansion. James C. Deyerle is credited with early construction. It has a double pile, central-hall plan and shallow hipped roof. Also on the property are the contributing brick smokehouse, a frame barn, a frame chicken coop, and a log structure that may have served as a blacksmith shop. The Samuel Cecil Archeological Site consists of the ruins of the log house built by Samuel Cecil in 1768.

It was added to the National Register of Historic Places in 2003.
