= New Dublin Presbyterian Church =

Historic church in Virginia, US

- U.S. National Register of Historic Places
- Virginia Landmarks Register
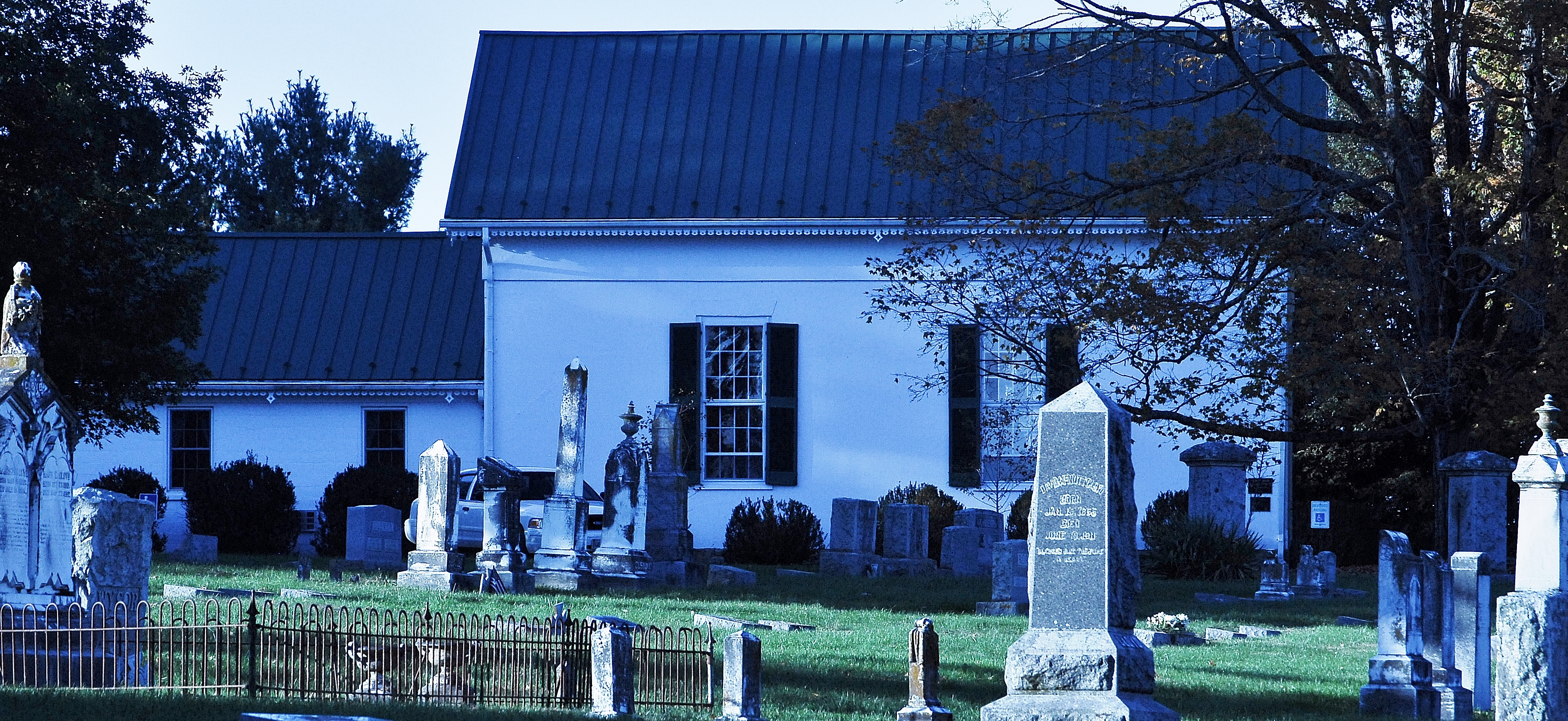

- Location within Virginia Location within the United States
- Nearest city: New Dublin Church Rd. Dublin, Virginia
- Coordinates: 37°07′19″N 80°41′21″W
- Area: 12 acres (4.9 ha)
- Built: 1840, 1874
- Built by: Vincent, J.; Walsh, Charles Miller
- Architectural style: Greek Revival, Gothic Revival
- NRHP reference No.: 04001272
- VLR No.: 077-0031

Significant dates
- Added to NRHP: November 26, 2004
- Designated VLR: September 8, 2004

New Dublin Presbyterian Church is a historic Presbyterian church complex located at Dublin, Pulaski County, Virginia. It was built in 1875, and incorporates part of a church built in 1840. It is a one-story, gable-roofed stuccoed brick church building. It primarily exhibits Greek Revival style character, with Gothic Revival style influences. It features a front entry with fanlight, a rose window, two-bay side elevations, a metal sheathed gable roof, and a limestone foundation. Also on the property are a contributing 1874 manse, a cemetery established on the eve of the American Civil War, and an outbuilding.

It was added to the National Register of Historic Places in 2004.

A 150 year old Copper Beech tree had toppled over in the yard of the Church in 2021.
