= Back Creek Farm =

Historic house in Virginia, United States

- U.S. National Register of Historic Places
- Virginia Landmarks Register
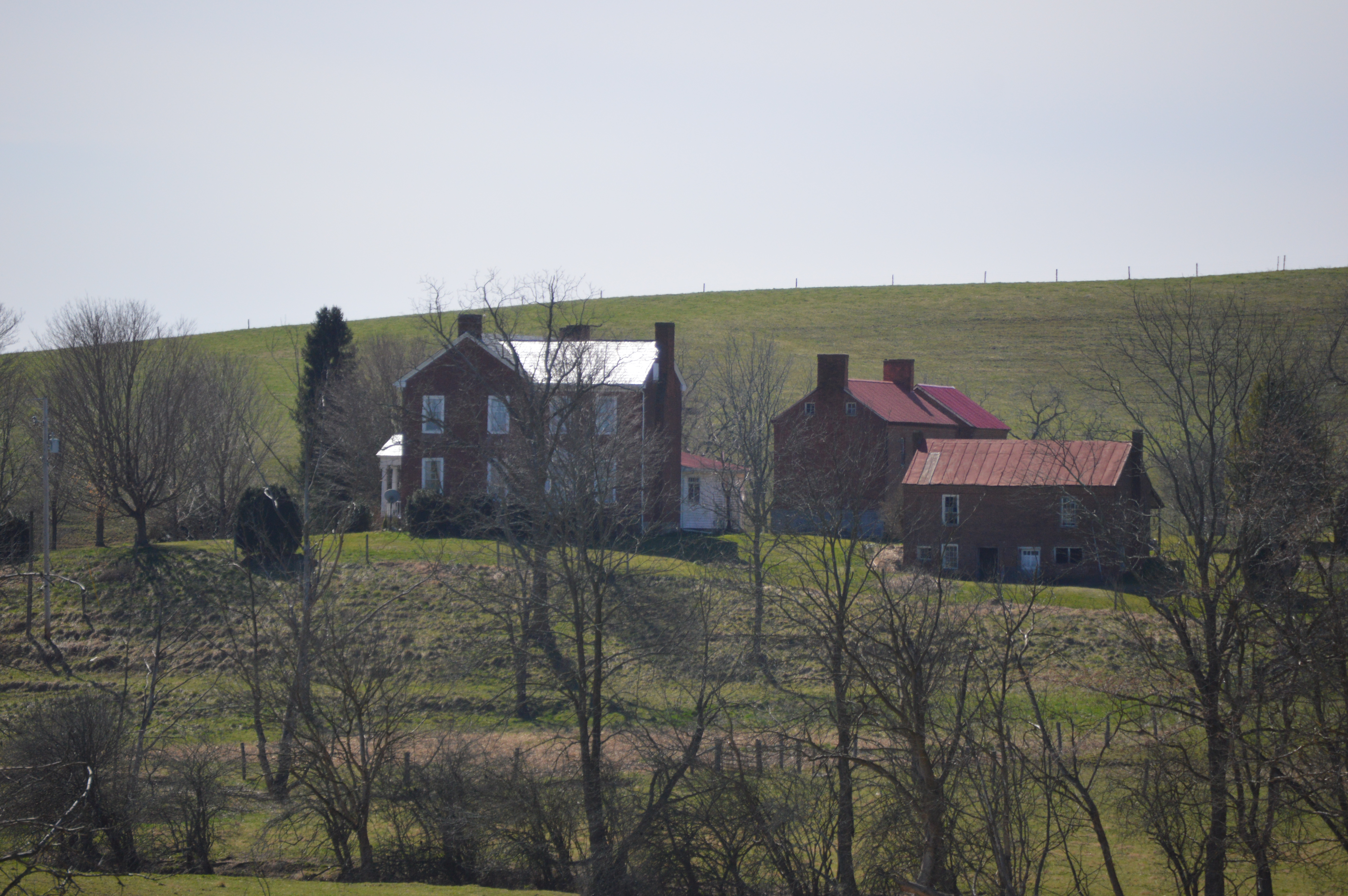
- Distant view from State Route 100 to the east

- Location within Virginia Location within the United States
- Location: NW side of VA 617, near Dublin, Virginia
- Coordinates: 37°10′00″N 80°42′44″W
- Area: 756 acres (306 ha)
- Architectural style: Early Republic
- NRHP reference No.: 75002032
- VLR No.: 077-0002

Significant dates
- Added to NRHP: May 21, 1975
- Designated VLR: February 18, 1975

Back Creek Farm is a historic home located near Dublin, Pulaski County, Virginia. It dates to the late-18th century, and is a two-story, five-bay, brick I-house with a side-gable roof. It has a two-story rear ell, sits on a rubble limestone basement, and has interior end chimneys with corbelled caps. The front facade features a pedimented tetrastyle Ionic order porch with an elegant frontispiece doorway with stop-fluted Corinthian order pilasters. Its builder was Joseph Cloyd (1742-1833). During the American Civil War, on May 9, 1864, the Battle of Cloyd's Mountain was fought on the property. The house served that day as a hospital and as headquarters for the Union General George Crook, under whose command were Captains Rutherford B. Hayes and William McKinley.

North of the house is the barn, a stone structure whose damage from Union artillery is still evident. This Pennsylvania barn is built of limestone of different sorts: many of the walls are rubble, while set above the basement windows are small arches of carefully prepared stonework.

It was added to the National Register of Historic Places in 1975.
