= Dublin, Virginia =

- Town
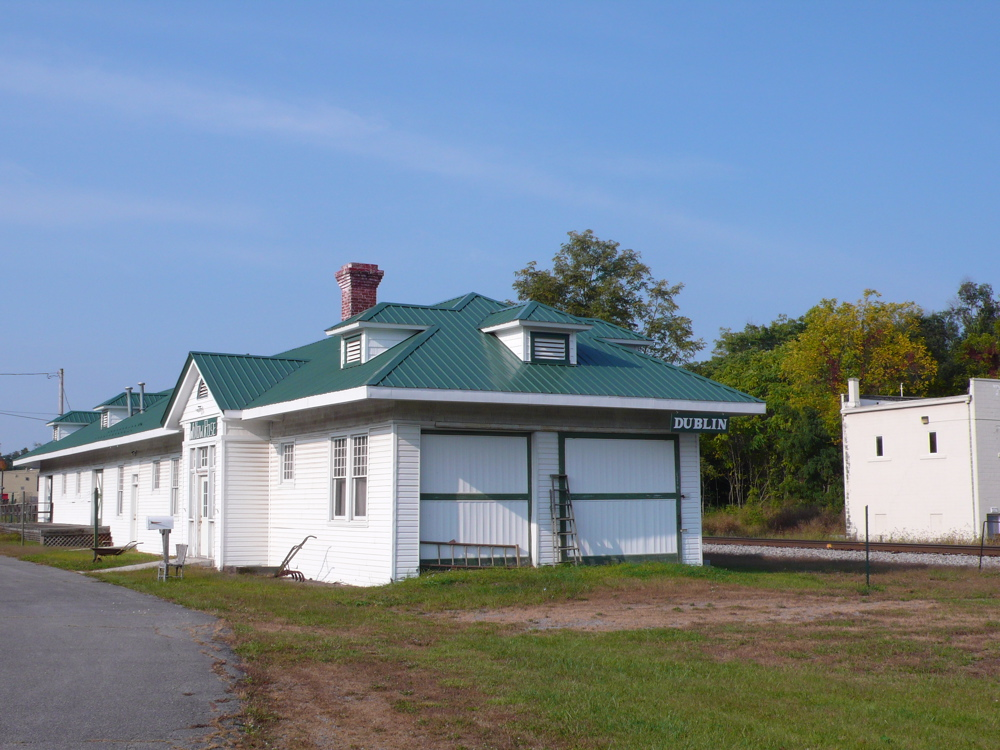
- The Old Train Station in Dublin, Virginia, which is now used as an area for businesses.
- Nickname: Dublin
- Location within Shenandoah Valley Location within Virginia Location within the United States
- Coordinates: 37°6′11″N 80°41′5″W
- Country: United States
- State: Virginia
- County: Pulaski

Area
  - Total: 1.36 sq mi (3.52 km^{2})
  - Land: 1.35 sq mi (3.50 km^{2})
  - Water: 0.0077 sq mi (0.02 km^{2})
- Elevation: 2,083 ft (635 m)

Population (2020)
  - Total: 2,682
  - Estimate (2019): 2,584
  - Density: 1,914.3/sq mi (739.13/km^{2})
- Time zone: UTC−5 (Eastern (EST))
  - Summer (DST): UTC−4 (EDT)
- ZIP code: 24084
- Area code: 540
- FIPS code: 51-23648
- GNIS feature ID: 1492886
- Website: Official website

Dublin is a town in Pulaski County, Virginia, United States. The population was 2,682 as of the 2020 Decennial Census. It is part of the Blacksburg-Christiansburg metropolitan area.

The town was named after Dublin in Ireland. A local legend says that the town was named after New Dublin Presbyterian Church, which was in turn named after Dublin, Ireland.

The town is located near the site of the Volvo Group Trucks Operations New River Valley Cab and Vehicle Assembly plant, and near the KORONA Candles Inc. factory. The New River Valley Regional Jail is located in Dublin, Virginia, and it serves the counties of Bland, Carroll, Floyd, Giles, Grayson, Pulaski, Wythe, and the City of Radford, VA.

== History ==
Back Creek Farm, Belle-Hampton, Dublin Historic District, Fairview District Home, Haven B. Howe House, New Dublin Presbyterian Church, Rockwood, and Spring Dale are listed on the National Register of Historic Places.

== Geography ==
Dublin is located at 37°6′11″N 80°41′5″W (37.103114, −80.684702).

According to the United States Census Bureau, the town has a total area of 1.4 square miles (3.7 km^{2}), all land.

== Economy ==
The Volvo Trucks North America New River Valley plant just outside Dublin is the largest Volvo truck plant in the world, employing 3,600 people and building multiple models of heavy-duty trucks. The New River Valley plant began manufacturing a battery-powered VNR Electric truck model in early 2021.

== Demographics ==
Historical population
Census	Pop.	Note	%±
1880	285		—
1910	350		—
1920	395		12.9%
1930	443		12.2%
1940	576		30.0%
1950	1,313		128.0%
1960	1,427		8.7%
1970	1,653		15.8%
1980	2,368		43.3%
1990	2,012		−15.0%
2000	2,288		13.7%
2010	2,534		10.8%
2020	2,682		5.8%
U.S. Decennial Census

As of the census of 2000, there were 2,288 people, 911 households, and 538 families living in the town.

Population density was 1,607.1 people per square mile (622.1/km^{2}). There were 969 housing units at an average density of 680.6 per square mile (263.5/km^{2}). The racial makeup of the town was 88.85% White, 8.57% African American, 0.22% Native American, 0.31% Asian, 0.48% from other races, and 1.57% from two or more races. Hispanic or Latino of any race were 0.66% of the population.

There were 911 households, out of which 25.8% had children under the age of 18 living with them, 40.4% were married couples living together, 13.9% had a female householder with no husband present, and 40.9% were non-families. 37.5% of all households were made up of individuals, and 13.3% had someone living alone who was 65 years of age or older. The average household size was 2.13 and the average family size was 2.79.

In the town, the population was spread out, with 18.3% under the age of 18, 12.8% from 18 to 24, 34.1% from 25 to 44, 21.7% from 45 to 64, and 13.2% who were 65 years of age or older. The median age was 34 years. For every 100 females, there were 108.8 males. For every 100 females age 18 and over, there were 107.3 males.

The median income for a household in the town was $27,831, and the median income for a family was $37,100. Males had a median income of $30,417 versus $23,936 for females. The per capita income for the town was $18,224. About 16.5% of families and 18.5% of the population were below the poverty line, including 30.0% of those under age 18 and 12.1% of those age 65 or over. Dublin is central to Claytor Lake, Radford, and Pulaski.

== Notable people ==
- Jim Brillheart, Major League Baseball pitcher
- Gary Clark, four-time Pro Bowl wide receiver for Washington Redskins (1985–1992) Phoenix Cardinals (1993–1994) and Miami Dolphins (1995)
- Shayne Graham, Cincinnati Bengals kicker.
- Ikey 'Banjo' Robinson, early jazz banjoist and singer

== See also ==
- List of Irish place names in other countries
- New River Community College
