= 22nd New York Cavalry Regiment =

- Active: March 8, 1864 (left NYS) to August 1, 1865 (mustered out)
- Country: United States
- Allegiance: Union
- Branch: Cavalry
- Engagements: Battle of the Wilderness; Battle of Spotsylvania Courthouse; Battle of Cold Harbor (at Port Royal, Virginia); Siege of Petersburg; Wilson–Kautz Raid; Sheridan's Valley Campaign; Battle of Waynesboro

Insignia
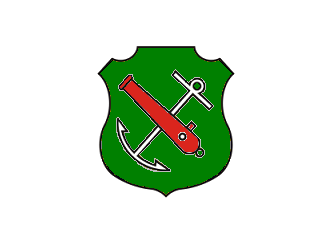
- 4th Division, IX Corps

The 22nd New York Cavalry Regiment was a cavalry regiment of the Union Army during the American Civil War.

== Service ==
The regiment was organized in Rochester, New York between December 1863 and February 1864, and was mustered in for three years' service. Some of the veterans recruited came from the 23rd New York Volunteer Infantry Regiment.

The companies were recruited principally:

- A at Rochester, Penn Yan, Perrinton, Penfield and Jerusalem;
- B at Syracuse, Rochester and Utica;
- C at Brockport, Rome, Riga, Churchville, Sweden and Rochester;
- D at Rochester, Lyons, Cuba and Linden;
- E at Cazenovia, Madison, Manlius, Syracuse and Smithfield;
- F at Rochester, Albion, Barre and Dunkirk;
- G at Bath, Avon, Urbana, Prattsburgh and Rochester;
- H at Syracuse, Arcadia, Sodus, Huron, Lyons and Palmyra;
- I at Rochester, Auburn, Syracuse and Seneca Falls;
- K at Rochester, Portland, Pomfret, Lenox, Smithfield and Dunkirk;
- L at Plymouth, Norwich, Otsego, Oxford, Middlefield, Greene, Unadilla and German; and
- M at Rochester, Oneida, Bath, Auburn and Utica.

The regiment served in the 9th Corps, at Alexandria, Virginia, from March, 1864; in the 4th Division, 9th Corps, from April, 1864; in the 2d Brigade, 3d Division, Cavalry Corps, Army of the Potomac, from May, 1864; unattached, Army of the Potomac, from May 8, 1864; with its brigade in June, 1864; with the Army of the Shenandoah from October, 1864, and in the Cavalry Division, Army of West Virginia, from February, 1865.

The regiment's reputation early in its existence was poor, largely in line with that of its recruiter and first commander, Colonel Samuel J. Crooks. Crooks' command of the 8th New York Cavalry earlier in the war had been so disastrous that he was forced to resign, yet he was given a second chance with this regiment. The Brockport newspaper in March 1864 reported Crooks' second effort "had the opposition of the Enrolling Board, a portion of the city press, and many prominent citizens." During the 22nd's organizational period in Rochester, soldiers from the regiment engaged in skirmishes with Rochester city police on the streets, and a murder occurred in camp during a boxing match; Crooks refused to cooperate with civil authorities in investigating until ordered to do so. During the Battle of Spotsylvania Courthouse the 22nd was considered "green" and Crooks prone to exaggeration (he was eventually placed under arrest by Major General George G. Meade); it reportedly "skedaddled" when hit by the Confederate forces of Armistead L. Long. Army of the Potomac Provost Marshal Marsena R. Patrick took the disorganized regiment under his wing, but they still had their horses stolen from them by the veteran 3rd Pennsylvania Cavalry. At the height of Grant's Overland Campaign, the unattached regiment was relegated to ambulance escort, picket, and port security duties at Fredericksburg, Port Royal, and White House Landing. Crooks and many of his troopers were captured during the First Battle of Ream's Station at the end of the Wilson-Kautz raid, when Wilson's division was largely cut off and surrounded. During the winter of 1864-5, the regiment was quartered at Camp Russell, where it subsisted in buildings made from the materials of a dismantled African American chapel in nearby Newtown. Company C's Captain Christopher C. Bruton received the Medal of Honor for the capture of Confederate Lt Gen Jubal Early's headquarters flag during the Battle of Waynesboro in March 1865.

The regiment was mustered out of service at Winchester, Virginia, on August 1, 1865, except for a detachment mustered out at Hart Island, New York on May 1 of that year.

== Total strength and casualties ==
During its service, the regiment lost by death, killed in action, 2 officers, 9 enlisted men; of wounds received in action, 1 officer, 13 enlisted men; of disease and other causes, 1 officer, 178 enlisted men; total, 4 officers, 200 enlisted men; aggregate, 204; of whom 87 enlisted men died in the hands of the enemy.

== Commanders ==
- Colonel Samuel J. Crooks
- Colonel Horatio Blake Reed

== See also ==
- List of New York Civil War regiments
