= James M. French =

American politician

Member of the Virginia Senate from the Pulaski, Bland, Giles and Russell Counties district

Colonel
- In office October 5, 1869 – December 5, 1871
- Preceded by: Charles L. Crockett
- Succeeded by: redistricting

Member of the Virginia Senate from the Pulaski, Bland, Tazewell and Russell counties district
- In office December 6, 1871 – December 31, 1873
- Preceded by: redistricting
- Succeeded by: Samuel H. Newberry

Personal details
- Born: September 14, 1834 Bland County, Virginia, U.S.
- Died: January 3, 1916 (aged 81) San Diego County, California
- Spouse(s): Rhoda Loudema Henderson, Lucy Gooch, Lillian Ogden
- Children: 9 (1 deceased)
- Occupation: Lawyer, soldier
- Profession: Politician, lawyer, judge

Military service
- Allegiance: Virginia; Confederate States of America
- Branch/service: Virginia Militia; Confederate States Army
- Rank: Colonel (CSA)
- Unit: 51st Virginia Infantry, 63rd Virginia Infantry
- Commands: 63rd Virginia Infantry
- Battles/wars: Battle of Fort Donelson Battle of Chickamauga; Atlanta campaign Battle of Murfreesboro

James Milton French (September 14, 1834 – January 3, 1916) was a nineteenth-century Virginia lawyer, Confederate officer and politician, who served as a delegate to the Virginia Constitutional Convention of 1868 and later became a state senator before moving west.

== Early life ==
On September 14, 1834, French was born to George Pearis French (1804–1850) and his wife Martha (Patsy) Bolton French (1808–1891) at Boyd Place, on Wolf Creek in what became Bland County, Virginia. His great-grandfather Matthew French (1737–1814) had married in Culpeper, Virginia, and settled with his wife and seven children on Wolf Creek in the New River (Kanawha River) valley in 1775. Matthew and his eldest son John had fought for independence in the Montgomery County militia, including at the Battle of Wetzell's Mills and Battle of Guilford Courthouse. French was named after his grandfather, Matthew's third son James. French had at least three brothers (Joseph, George and Daniel French) who later served under him in the Confederate States Army. French read law and was admitted to the bar in Wise County, Virginia, before the American Civil War.

French married three times. His first marriage was on February 20, 1856, to Rhoda Loudema Henderson (1836–1879), daughter of his legal mentor Augustus F. Henderson (elected Commonwealth Attorney of Wise County in 1860). They had at least eight children, of whom seven survived to adulthood: Nancy Jane French (1856–1860) died as a child, Robert Napoleon French (1859–1927) later became a lawyer in Arizona, Wirt A. French (1862–1918) moved to West Virginia, James Thompson French (1866–1943) became a Methodist minister in Kentucky, Virginia Katharine French (1866–1954), George Henderson French (1871–1940), Mattie May French (1876–1963) and Oshie Anna French Sincock (1878–1964) of North Carolina. After Rhoda French died, French married Lucy Gooch, and later on July 21, 1898, Lillian Lee Ogden (1866–1960), who survived him.

== Career ==
The Virginia Capitol in Richmond where 19th century Virginia Conventions met

French had begun his legal practice in Gladeville in Wise County, Virginia, but soon moved to Pearisburg, the Giles County seat which was named for his ancestor. His practice included several southwest Virginia counties. He ran for Commonwealth attorney of Wise County against his father-in-law in 1860, but lost.

== Confederate military officer ==
During the American Civil War, French and his brother Joseph enlisted in the 51st Virginia Infantry at Abingdon on July 16, 1861, along with Augustus Henderson and others from Wise County. Joseph S. French remained a private in the Confederate States Army and received a medical discharge a month later, as would many members of the unit by winter (which lost far more men due to exposure, poor diet and the camp diseases of pneumonia, dysentery, typhoid fever and measles than in combat; Joseph S. French would then re-enlist in his brother's 63rd Virginia in Chattanooga in November 1863 but had baggage duty and went home the following February).

In mid-1861 Augustus Henderson received a first lieutenant's commission and his son-in-law James French received a second lieutenant's commission. The unit, commanded at first by Brig. Gen. Gabriel C. Wharton and Lt. Col. James Woods Massie both VMI professors, and George Alfred Cunningham, tried to defend the Kanawha Valley, but by fall lost the Battle of Carnifex Ferry (which led to the creation of the state of West Virginia). By January 2, 1862, the remainder of the 51st Virginia and other units traveled by railroad to Bowling Green, Kentucky, where they took steamboats to assist the defense of Nashville, Tennessee. After combination with the 56th Virginia in mid-February 1862, the Confederates lost the Battle of Fort Donelson on the Cumberland River, the first major combat the 51st Virginia faced. However, the unit managed to evacuate before the fort's surrender to assist in defending Nashville and Chattanooga. It returned to Abington in late March 1862 to recover and reorganize. Its General, former Virginia governor John G. Floyd, was then reassigned to organize the Virginia State Line Battalion of home guards, and many men resigned (or transferred or refused to re-enlist) after disciplinarian Gen. Henry Heth was placed in command. Later that year, they won the Battle of Charleston (1862) and seized the Kanawha saltworks.

However, on May 26, 1862, immediately after the 51st Virginia participated in the ignominious defeat at the Battle of Lewisburg (where panicked Confederates escaped and burned the bridge over the Greenbrier River in their escape), Lt. French was released from the 51st Virginia to help recruit the 63rd Virginia Infantry in southwest Virginia and southern West Virginia. He received a commission as major (under Col. James J. McMahon, a Presbyterian minister who had previously served under Gen. Floyd). The 63rd Virginia trained at Camp Narrows near Pearisburg during the summer of 1862 and on September 12, 1862, scored their first victory, a skirmish at Montgomery Ferry in the Charleston Campaign, but withdrew from the Kanawha valley again, because reinforcements were needed after the Battle of Antietam in October 1862, and these troops were likely returned to Giles County to guard the narrows of the New River and Saltville, Virginia. On December 17, 1862, they embarked trains at Wytheville and arrived to defend Richmond two days later. They camped and fought that winter in Southampton County, Virginia, and northeastern North Carolina, although Col. French was away recruiting much of the time.

On April 15, 1863, Col. John Dils (1818–1895) and the Unionist 39th Kentucky home guard captured Col. French, together with his company surgeon, 14 officers and 70 men near Shelby Fork and Pikeville in eastern Kentucky, where they were attempting to recruit the 65th Virginia regiment (as well as dissuading Confederate sympathizers from enrolling in Col. Nathaniel C. Menifee's regiment, which had raided Pikeville and also engaged in atrocities). Col. French and other Confederate prisoners were taken to Camp Chase in Ohio. In part due to Col. Dils' high regard for Col. French's integrity (and Dils' prior imprisonment at the notorious Libby Prison in Richmond), they were exchanged for Union prisoners at City Point, Virginia, within a month, and many ceased fighting. Col. James French's brother George D. French commanded Company D of the 63rd Virginia, and would continue to command Company B under Col. Clarence J. Prentice of Kentucky, when the unit also was involved in atrocities.

On September 13, 1863, Col. McMahon was removed from command of the 63rd Virginia, and Major French led the men to victory during the Battle of Chickamauga on September 18–21, 1863, where about 1/3 became casualties and Lt.Col. Abram Fulkerson (although technically of the 63rd Tennessee, and later a U.S. Congressman from Virginia) was among those receiving commendations for valor. However, Confederate forces were then defeated at the Battle of Missionary Ridge on November 25, 1863, and the unit's provisioning and disease problems worsened that winter.

French was promoted to colonel on April 4, 1864, and wounded in action on August 22, 1864, at Mt. Zion Church during the Atlanta campaign. He was taken prisoner a second time on December 5, 1864, near La Vergne, Tennessee, during the Franklin-Nashville Campaign and again sent to Camp Chase on April 11, 1865, where he was paroled on July 25, 1865.

== Postwar career ==
Following the war, French resumed his legal practice at Pearisburg and surrounding counties. Wise County had only one resident lawyer, the Commonwealth Attorney by default, Alexander W. Smith.

In 1867, voters from Bland and Tazewell counties elected French to the Virginia Constitutional Convention of 1868. A Conservative, he was the sole delegate elected from that western transmontane convention district. Voters in July 1869 ultimately approved that new state Constitution (which eliminated the 1850 Constitution's provisions authorizing slavery, among others) and refused to adopt two provisions disenfranchising former Confederates.

Following the Constitution's approval (which allowed Congressional Reconstruction to end and Virginia's readmission to the Union), French was subsequently elected and reelected to the Senate of Virginia. Although the district boundaries changed in 1867, 1869 and again in 1871, he represented Pulaski, Bland, Giles and Russell for the 1869/70 and 1870/71 sessions, and Pulaski, Bland, Tazewell and Russell counties in 1871/72 and 1872/73.

However, by 1880, French had moved his practice (including a law student boarder) and family to Mercer, West Virginia, on the New River (Kanawha River). The city had grown because of a Chesapeake and Ohio Railroad line through Huntington, which linked Virginia and West Virginia coalfields to the Ohio River.

In 1899, Governor James Hoge Tyler appointed French as a member of the Virginia Commission working with a National Commission to locate the position of Virginia troops in the Battle of Chickamauga.

French later moved to Cochise County, Arizona, where his eldest son Robert N. French practiced law. The 75-year-old operated a ranch with his third wife Lilian and grandson Wirt (1887–1857) in 1910.

== Death ==
French later moved to southern California, where his daughter May lived with her husband Howard F. Worth, a wealthier merchant (and independent Republican, although Mrs. May Worth was president of the Woman's Woodrow Wilson League of San Diego County, among other charitable activities). French died in San Diego County, California, on January 3, 1916.
