= Augustus Forsberg =

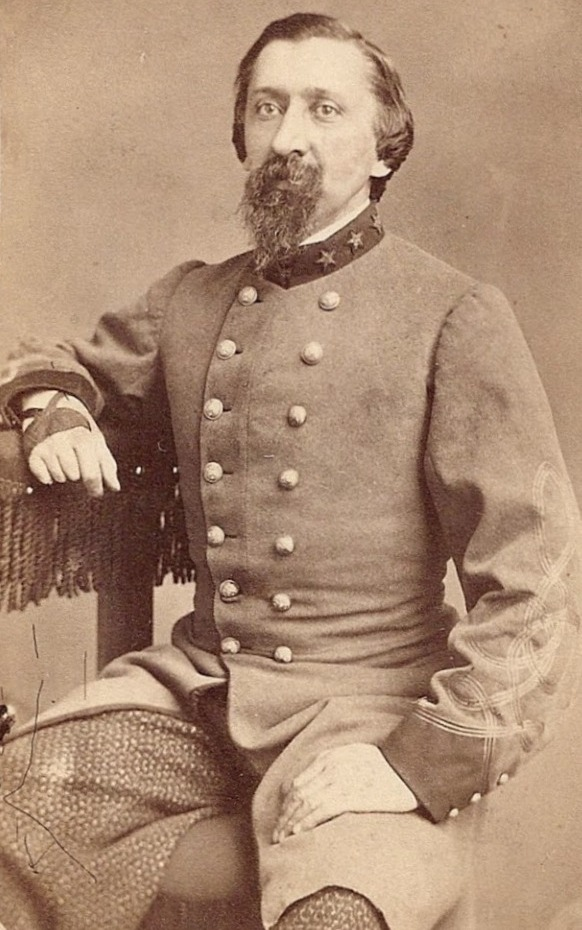
- Colonel Forsberg as wounded in Lynchburg, Virginia.
- Born: Ludwig August Forsberg; January 13, 1832; Stockholm, Sweden
- Died: July 15, 1910 (aged 78); Lynchburg, Virginia
- Spouse: Mary Elizabeth Forsberg
- Military career
- Allegiance: Sweden; Confederate States of America
- Branch: Royal Swedish Engineers; Confederate States Army
- Service years: Ca 1850-1855 (Sweden); 1861–1865 (CSA)
- Rank: Colonel, CSA
- Commands: 51st Virginia Infantry; Forsberg's Brigade
- Conflicts: American Civil War: Battle of Carnifex Ferry; Battle of Fort Donelson; Battle of Charleston (1862); Battle of Cold Harbor; Battle of Lynchburg; Battle of Monocacy; Battle of Fort Stevens; Second Battle of Kernstown; Third Battle of Winchester WIA; Battle of Waynesboro, Virginia POW
- Awards: Cited for bravery at Fort Donelson

Augustus Forsberg (1832-1910) was a Swedish military engineer who emigrated to the United States in 1855. First settling in Charleston, South Carolina, he had strong sympathies for the Southern cause. When the Civil War began, he joined the Confederacy and was commissioned to the rank of lieutenant in the regular Confederate army 1861. Attached to the 51st Virginia Volunteer Infantry, he was elected its lieutenant colonel when the regiment was reorganized in the spring of 1862. Subsequently, promoted to its colonel, he commanded a brigade at the end of the war. Wounded at Winchester in 1864, he became a prisoner-of-war at Waynesboro in 1865. Once released, he ventured to Lynchburg, Virginia, to marry the woman he had met while recovering. They settled and made a family in the town, and Forsberg served as Lynchburg's city engineer for over twenty years.

== Early life ==
Born in Stockholm, Forsberg graduated from the Royal Institute of Technology, and served as a lieutenant in the Royal Swedish Engineers. In 1855, he moved to the United States, working as an engineer on a government project in Charleston, South Carolina. He later worked as an architect in Baltimore and as a draftsman at the United States Capitol Building in Washington, D.C., at the time still under construction.

== Civil War ==
Forsberg was well known for his Southern sympathies. When the Civil War began, the Danish consul informed him that the United States government would offer him a commission in the army, and that if he refused it, he would be arrested. Forsberg soon found a place on a fishing vessel that took him to Charleston, where he was employed as a volunteer topographical engineer in the defense of the city. In August 1861, Forsberg moved to Richmond, Virginia where he met John B. Floyd, former U.S. Secretary of War, who advised him to apply to President Jefferson Davis in person for a commission in the Confederate army. Commissioned as a lieutenant, Forsberg was detailed to serve on the staff of Floyd, then a brigadier general in command of the Confederate troops in the Kanawha Valley.

Forsberg was commissioned first lieutenant in the Corps of Infantry of the Army of the Confederate States of America (the regular army of the Confederacy). The Provisional Congress of the Confederate States confirmed his commission on January 24, 1862, to take rank from October 11, 1861. In August 1861, Forsberg had been detached from the Floyd's staff to the 51st Virginia Infantry, to aid with the training of the men. He remained with the regiment during the rest of the war. In early February 1862, the regiment, with the rest of Floyd's division, was sent to Fort Donelson, in order to strengthen its garrison. Lieutenant Forsberg was commended for his bravery during the battle of Fort Donelson. When the fort surrendered, Floyd's command managed to escape.

Having escaped from the prison camp, the 51st Virginia Infantry eventually returned to Virginia. Reorganized at Wytheville, several officers left the service, including the lieutenant colonel James W. Massie. In accordance with the Confederate Conscription Act, elections of new officers were held in the beginning of May. Forsberg was elected in Massie's stead, and was officially commissioned on May 26, 1862. When in August 1862, Colonel Gabriel C. Wharton became brigade commander, Lieutenant Colonel Forsberg was put in his placer as commanding officer, and would henceforth lead the regiment. In July 1863, Colonel Wharton was promoted to brigadier general, and Forsberg was subsequently promoted to full colonel on July 8, 1863. In hospital at Lynchburg, Virginia during the battle of New Market, Forsberg could not command his regiment. During the battle of Lynchburg, Forsberg commanded Wharton's brigade, as the general had been put in command of Breckinridge's division. Leading the brigade at the third battle of Winchester, Forsberg was shot in his right hand while trying to rally his men. He did not return to active service until February 1865, when he resumed the brigade command. At the battle of Waynesboro, Forsberg, as well as most of his command, become prisoners of war.

== Postbellum ==
Forsberg remained a prisoner of war at Fort Delaware until released in June 1865. He then returned to Lynchburg, where he recovered after his wounding at Winchester. During his stay at the Ladies Relief Hospital in the city, he had met Mary Elizabeth Otey, the widow of a young officer, George Gaston Otey, who had been killed in action early in the war. She was the daughter-in-law of Lucy Mina Otey, the founder of the hospital, and worked as a nurse there. Soon after his return, Forsberg married Mary Elizabeth, and the family settled in the city. Forsberg served as a city engineer for 21 years, and designed many of the city's public buildings, some of which were in the Fifth Street Historic District. Forsberg died in 1910.

Here lies this generous stranger, who watered with his precious blood the tree of liberty.

Eulogy at Forsberg's funeral.
