= Robert Niven (soldier) =

American soldier (1833–1921)

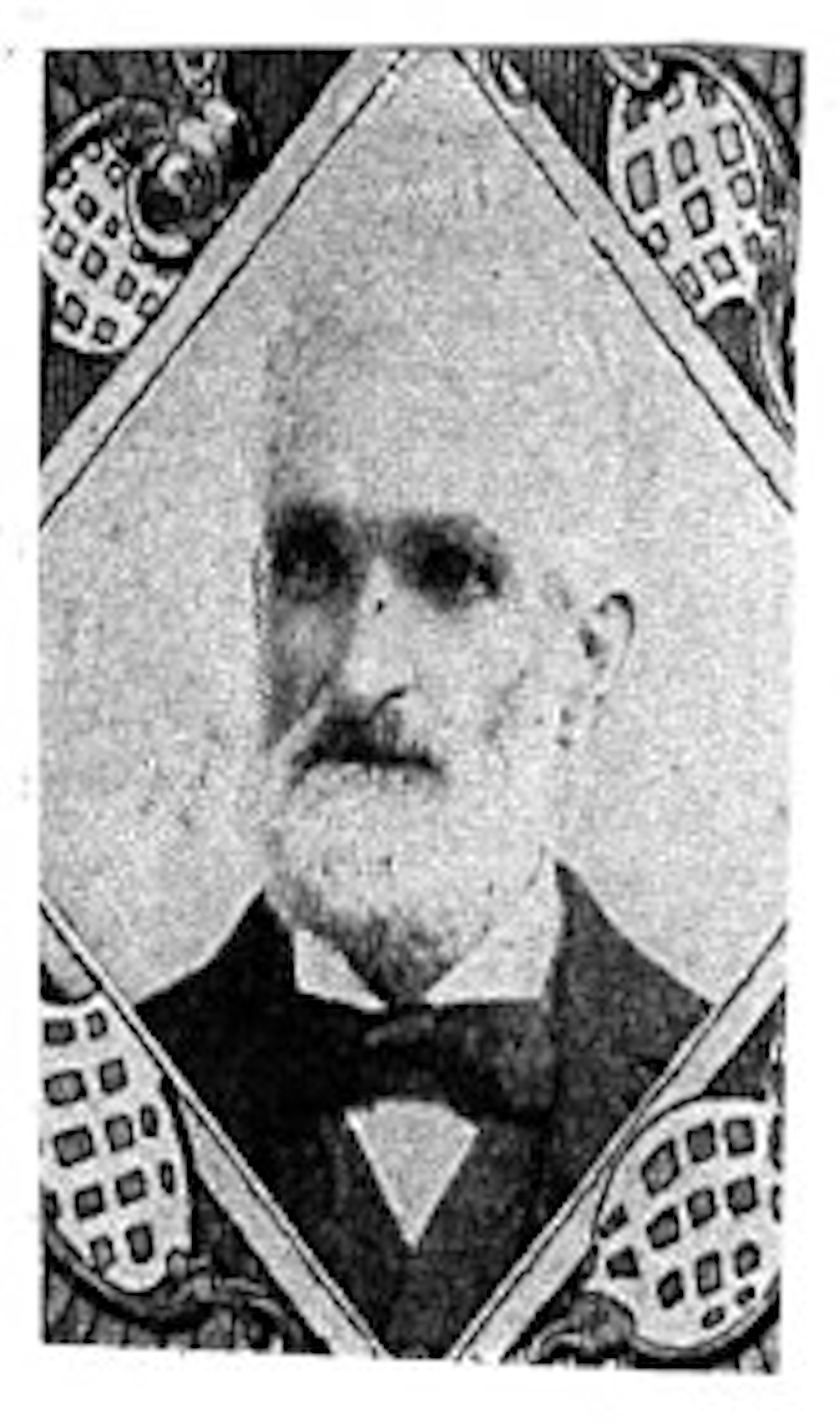
- Born: December 18, 1833; Harlem, New York
- Died: December 21, 1921 (aged 88)
- Burial place: Lakewood, Rhode Island
- Military career
- Allegiance: United States of America
- Branch: United States Army
- Rank: Second Lieutenant
- Units: (New York (state)) Company H, 8th New York Volunteer Cavalry Regiment
- Conflicts: Battle of Waynesboro; American Civil War
- Awards: Medal of Honor

Robert Niven (December 18, 1833 - December 21, 1921) was an American soldier who fought in the American Civil War. Niven received his country's highest award for bravery during combat, the Medal of Honor. Niven's medal was won for capturing two Confederate flags at the Battle of Waynesboro, Virginia, on March 2, 1865. He was honored with the award on March 26, 1865.

Niven was born in Harlem in New York and entered service in Rochester. He was later buried in Lakewood, Rhode Island.

== Medal of Honor citation ==
The President of the United States of America, in the name of Congress, takes pleasure in presenting the Medal of Honor to Second Lieutenant Robert Niven, United States Army, for extraordinary heroism on 2 March 1865, while serving with Company H, 8th New York Cavalry, in action at Waynesboro, Virginia, for capture of two flags.

== See also ==
- List of American Civil War Medal of Honor recipients: G–L
