= Hartwell B. Compson =

American Civil War military officer (1842–1905)

Hartwell Thomas Benton Compson
- Born: May 5, 1842; Seneca Falls, New York, US
- Died: August 31, 1905 (aged 63); Portland, Oregon, US
- Military career
- Allegiance: United States; Union
- Branch: United States Army; Oregon National Guard
- Service years: 1861–1865 (US Army)
- Rank: Major and Brevet Colonel (US Army); Brigadier General (National Guard)
- Unit: (New York (state)) 8th New York Cavalry Regiment
- Commands: 8th New York Cavalry Regiment
- Conflicts: American Civil War
- Awards: Medal of Honor

Hartwell Thomas Benton Compson (May 5, 1842 – August 31, 1905) was an American military officer who received the Medal of Honor for heroism in the American Civil War.

== Biography ==
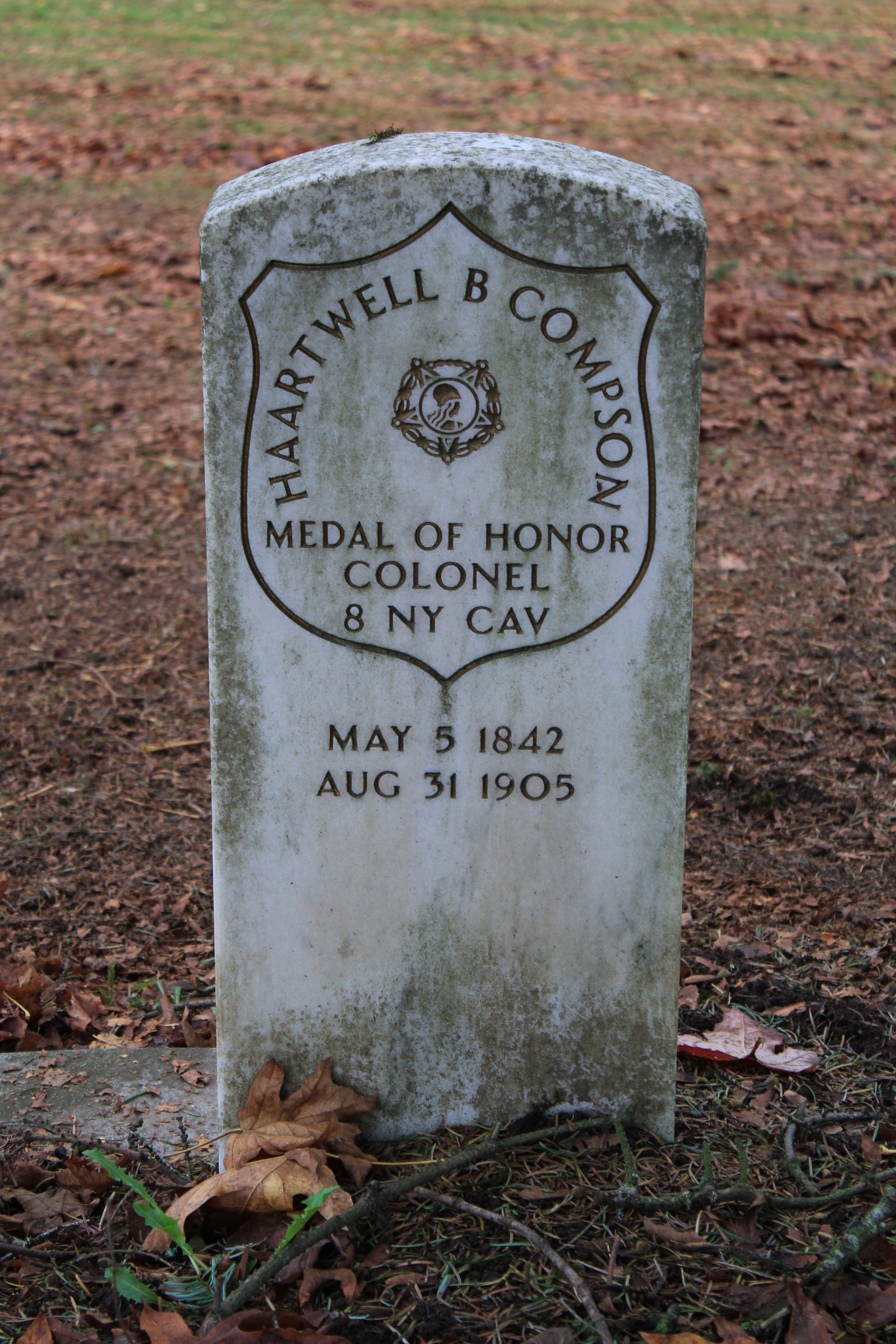
Hartwell B. Compson 1842-1905

Compson was born May 5, 1842, in Seneca Falls, New York, the second of thirteen children born to Jonas and Ruth Compson. He volunteered for the 8th New York Cavalry Regiment in September 1861. Rising rapidly through the ranks, he eventually became regimental commander. On March 2, 1865, he led his troops into battle at Waynesboro, Virginia. During fierce hand-to-hand combat, Major Compson personally captured the headquarters flag of Confederate general Jubal Early. For this action he would receive the Medal of Honor. In addition, Compson was breveted to colonel by General Philip Sheridan. Unlike many of the men whose bravery was not recognized for decades, Compson received his medal within a month of the battle. After mustering out in June 1865, Compson worked as a U.S. Marshal and Postmaster and eventually moved to Oregon where he became Brigadier General of the Oregon National Guard. He died on August 31, 1905, in Portland, Oregon, where he is buried in the Grand Army of the Republic Cemetery. Following his death in 1905, Compson faded from memory and his grave went unmarked for 100 years until Civil War amateur historians Roy Vanderhoof and Mike Stephenson, along with the considerable assistance of Congresswoman Darlene Hooley of the 5th Congressional District, obtained a proper headstone from the Veterans Administration.

== Medal of Honor citation ==
Rank and organization: Major, 8th New York Cavalry. Place and date: At Waynesboro, Va., March 2, 1865. Entered service at: Seneca Falls, N.Y. Birth: Seneca Falls, N.Y. Date of issue: March 26, 1865.

Citation:

Capture of flag belonging to Gen. Early's headquarters.

Captain Christopher C. Bruton of the 22nd New York Cavalry is also credited with the capture of this flag. The flag itself was a Confederate Second National flag measuring 4’ x 6’ and was presented by Compson to the Secretary of War. The Federal government returned the flag to Virginia in 1906. It is in the possession of The Museum of the Confederacy in Richmond.

== See also ==
- List of Medal of Honor recipients
- List of American Civil War Medal of Honor recipients: A–F
