= 36th Virginia Infantry Regiment =

- Flag of Virginia, 1861
- Active: July 1861 – April 1865
- Disbanded: April 1865
- Country: Confederacy
- Allegiance: Confederate States of America
- Branch: Confederate States Army
- Type: Infantry
- Engagements: American Civil War: Battle of Carnifex Ferry; Battle of Fort Donelson; Battle of Fayetteville; Battle of Cloyd's Mountain; Battle of Piedmont; Valley Campaigns of 1864; Battle of Waynesboro, Virginia

Commanders
- Notable commanders: Col. John McCausland; Col. Thomas Smith

The 36th Virginia Infantry Regiment was an infantry regiment mostly raised in the Kanawha Valley (then of Virginia, but which became West Virginia) for service in the Confederate States Army during the American Civil War. It fought mostly in western Virginia, Tennessee, and Kentucky.

== History ==
The 36th Virginia, also known as the 2nd Kanawha Regiment, began organizing in May, 1861, as VMI graduate turned professor Col. John McCausland requested V.M.I. to send him drill instructors for men recruited by Col. Christopher Q. Tompkins and sent to Camp Buffalo. Other recruits by Col. Tompkins became the Kanawha Regiment (later the 22nd Virginia Infantry). In June additional recruits joined at camps near Charleston. The primary counties of recruitment were Putnam, Boone, Roane, Nicholas, Raleigh, Logan, Giles and Bland. It was formally enrolled in the Confederate Army and designated the 36th Virginia Infantry on July 15, 1861. It and the 22nd Virginia were initially assigned under the command of former Virginia Governor Henry A. Wise. Its scouts first encountered Union forces on July 13 and on July 17 under Col. George S. Patton defeated Federal forces at the Battle of Scary Creek, but those men (James T. Sweeney's Company, were disbanded after the fight and many joined Capt. Fife's Buffalo Guards. The unit suffered provisioning difficulties, disease and many desertions. It initially had three cavalry companies, but James Corns' Cavalry Company was sent to the 8th Virginia Cavalry and William Lipscomb's cavalry to the 22nd Virginia by August. In late September 1861, Albert Beckett's Cavalry was mustered out of this regiment.

Assigned to Floyd's Brigade in late August 1861, the unit fought at the Battle of Kessler's Cross Lanes and the Battle of Carnifex Ferry in western Virginia (acting as a rear guard during the latter defeat), then tried to set up a winter camp near the Fayetteville Court House, but ended up retreating from the Kanawha valley and attempting another winter camp at Dublin Depot (of the Virginia and Tennessee Railroad in Pulaski County, Virginia). However, they were ordered to join Gen. Albert Sidney Johnston at Bowling Green, Kentucky, so they left after Christmas. The 36th Virginia was involved in skirmishes on January 23, 1862 in Mercer County, West Virginia and January 28, 1862 in Raleigh County, West Virginia. By February they were attempting to defend Nashville, Tennessee. Here the 36th Virginia escaped surrender at the Battle of Fort Donelson. After Nashville surrendered, many men received furloughs until May 1 and returned to Virginia.

The unit reunited at Dublin Depot, retaking the Giles County courthouse (at Pearisburg on May 10 and regained control of the Virginia and Tennessee Railroad. The unit was reorganized near Pearisburg. General Loring then replaced General Floyd and the 36th Virginia fought in the Kanawha Valley Campaign of 1862, attempting to regain the Kanawha valley and crucial salt supplies. The successful retaking of the Kanawha Valley did not last long, and Loring began moving his men out of the Kanawha valley in October 1862. He was relieved of command and replaced by Gen. John S. Echols, who however was retreating from Charleston by month's end. The 36th Virginia skirmished in Raleigh county on December 20 and Roane County on Christmas, then encamped in Mercer County during the winter of 1862–1863. It skirmished in Boone County on March 11, then in Logan and Fayette Counties on April 4–9, 1863, then in Pike County, Kentucky on May 9 and in Faytetteville on May 15 and 20. It encamped at "Camp Piney" near Pearisburg that summer, preparing the defend the saltworks in Smyth County.

In 1864 the 36th experienced the most fighting (and battle losses) of the war. Some of its troops skirmished in Raleigh County in January, Boone and Nicholas Counties in February and again in Raleigh County in March. In May the 36th Virginia fought the Battle of Cloyd's Mountain, a Confederate loss. Subsequently, assigned to General William E. Jones (who commanded western Virginia troops), Col. McCausland was promoted to brigadier general of what had been the late Gen. Albert Jenkins' cavalry brigade. Gen. Imboden's cavalry asked for support against Union General Hunter's army, so the 36th Virginia and other units took trains to Staunton, Virginia, where they fought the Battle of Piedmont, during which Gen. Jones was mortally wounded and the 36th Virginia suffered its most significant battle losses to date. It was then involved in Gen. Jubal Early's Shenandoah Valley operations. McCausland's cavalry burned Chambersburg, Pennsylvania when it refused (or was unable to pay) ransom.

After the losses at Third Battle of Winchester and Fisher's Hill in September 1864, the 36th Virginia was reinforced with many conscripts over the age of 35. Although its last battle-related death was on October 19, 1864 (the Battle of Cedar Creek), many from the unit had been taken prisoner before the winter encampment at Fishersville with the 60th Virginia Infantry. This unit reported 14 killed and 46 wounded at Battle of Fort Donelson, and 18 killed, 58 wounded, and 35 missing at the Battle of Cloyd's Mountain. Then it suffered 29 dead, 36 wounded and 112 captured at the Battle of Piedmont. Many were lost at the Third Battle of Winchester, and Southern forces under Early were routed at the Waynesboro on March 2, 1865. In mid-April, 1865, the 36th Virginia disbanded and the men returned to their homes in the western counties.

The field officers were Colonels John McCausland and Thomas Smith (a son of Confederate general and war-time Governor of Virginia William "Extra Billy" Smith who later became a territorial judge in New Mexico before returning to Virginia), and Lieutenant Colonels William E. Fife, Benjamin R. Linkous, and L. Wilber Reid.

== Companies and officers ==
Sortable table
Company	Nickname	Recruited at	First (then later) Commanding Officer
A	Buffalo Guards	Putnam County	William Estill Fife; Andrew J. Burford
B	Logan County Wildcats	Logan County	Henry Beckley combined with Companies C and H as Co. D
C	Chapmanville Riflemen	Logan County	Charles J. Stone; James M. Lawson; Hugh Toney
D	Boone Rangers	Boone County	James Whann McSherry reorganized as Co.B in 1862
E	Raleigh Rangers	Raleigh County	Benjamin R. Linkous; Christopher Roles reorganized as Co.C in 1862
F	Mountain Riflemen	Nicholas County, West Virginia	John G. Newman; Francis Thornton
G	Western Riflemen	Roane County	Franklin P. Turner; George Duval; John S. McGuire reorganized as Co.E in 1862
G1	Bland Riflemen	Bland County	John H. Harner; Henry C. Grossclose organized 1862
H	Captain Louis Lechenet's Company	Logan County	Louis Lechenet combined with Companies B and C as Co. D
H1		Giles County	Andrew J. Porterfield; James F. Hare organized 1862
I		Giles County; Franklin County; Roanoke County	Andrew A. Gott
K	Fairview Rifle Guards	Wayne County	Peter D. Morgan originally Company I or K with Captain Riggs' Company; reorganized in 1862 with transfers from other companies

== See also ==
- List of Virginia Civil War units
- List of West Virginia Civil War Confederate units
