= Grand Army of the Republic Cemetery (Seattle) =

Historic cemetery in King County, Washington

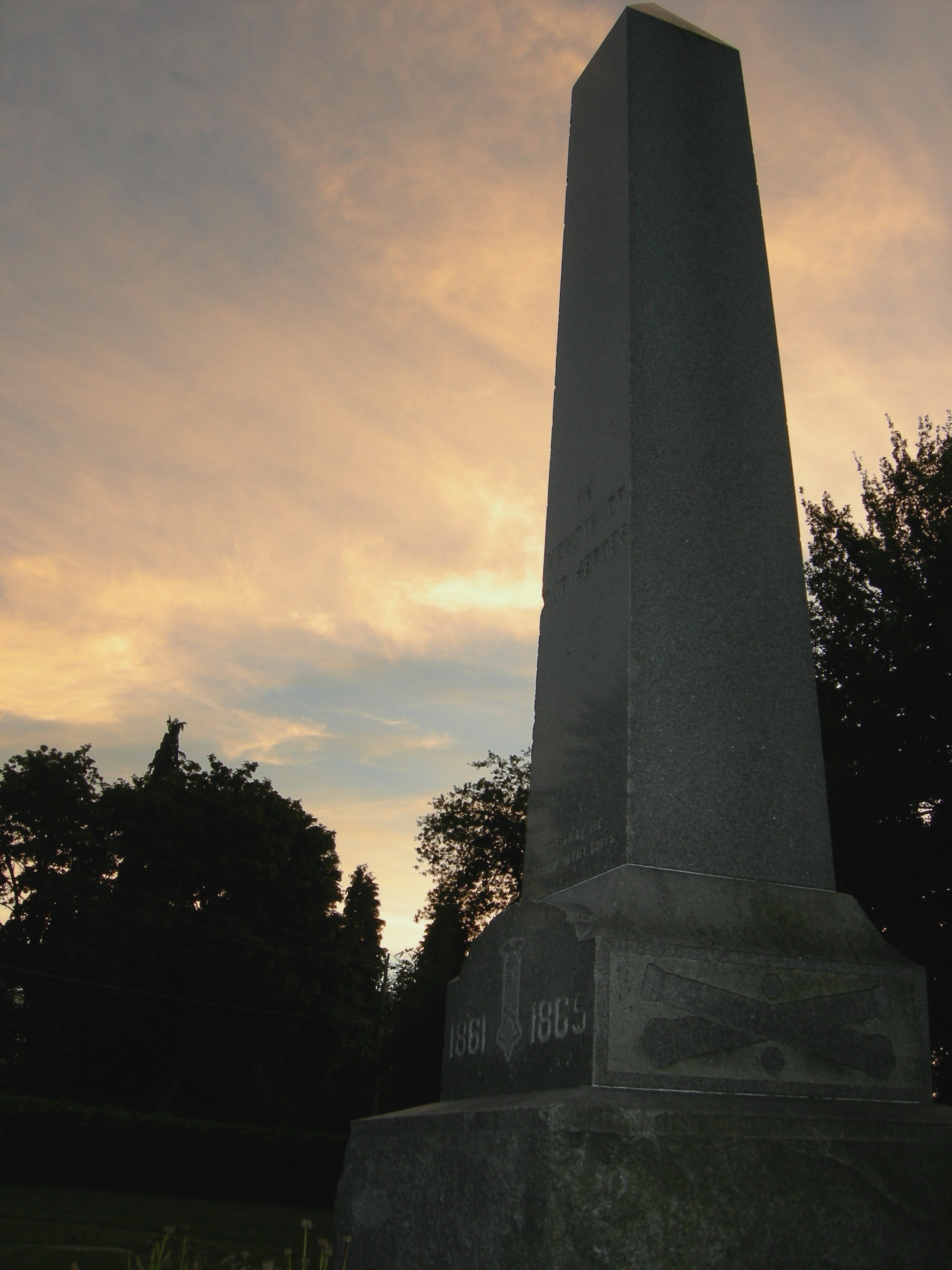
- Sunset at GAR Cemetery Park
- Interactive map of Grand Army of the Republic Cemetery

Details
- Established: 1895
- Location: Seattle, Washington
- Country: United States
- Coordinates: 47°38′11″N 122°18′57″W
- No. of graves: ~580
- Website: GAR Cemetery from the Seattle Department of Parks and Recreation website

The Grand Army of the Republic Cemetery on Seattle, Washington's Capitol Hill is a cemetery situated just north of Lake View Cemetery on the hill's northern slope, on East Howe Street between 12th and Everett Avenues East.

A consortium of Seattle's five Grand Army of the Republic posts – Stevens Post #1, Miller Post #31, Cushing Post #56, Saxton Post #103, and Green Lake #112 – established the cemetery in 1895 on land donated by Huldah and David Kaufman, two of the city's earliest Jewish settlers, who arrived in 1869. The G.A.R. posts maintained the cemetery until 1922, when they gave the property, excluding of the 526 gravesites, to the city of Seattle. The association deeded the gravesites to the Stevens Post who hired neighboring Lake View Cemetery to maintain the grounds.

The cemetery fell into decline over the following decades, because of confusion over land title, the failure in 1939 to secure WPA project, the imposition during World War II of the Coast Artillery on the grounds, and so on. In 1960, the city attempted to transfer maintenance to the Veterans Administration, either in situ or by moving the graves to Fort Lawton in Magnolia, now Discovery Park, but the VA was unable to allocate money on cemeteries it did not own, and the graves were never moved. The land surrounding the graves came under the jurisdiction of Seattle's Department of Parks and Recreation.

In 1996, the parks department proposed that the park become an off-leash dog-run; in response to this, the Friends of the GAR Cemetery Park formed the next year. Members of the group now staff monthly work parties, are involved in headstone replacement, and perform daily flag raising.

The cemetery holds the remains of Medal of Honor recipient Frank Bois (1841–1920), who was honored for heroism while aboard the USS Cincinnati during the Battle of Vicksburg, Mississippi during the Civil War.

== See also ==
- Grand Army of the Republic Cemetery (Portland, Oregon)
