= Thomas J. Smith (judge) =

American judge (1838–1918)

- Born: July 26, 1838; Culpeper County, Virginia, U.S.
- Died: June 29, 1918 (aged 79); Richmond, Virginia, U.S.
- Resting place: Hollywood Cemetery
- Occupations: Politician; judge
- Father: William Smith

Thomas J. Smith (July 26, 1838 – June 29, 1918) was chief justice of the New Mexico Territorial Supreme Court from 1893 to 1898. A native of Virginia, he served in the Confederate States Army during the American Civil War, becoming Colonel of the 36th Virginia Infantry Regiment.

== Early life ==
Born in Culpeper County, Virginia, to William Smith, once governor of Virginia, and a descendant of Sir Sidney Smith of England. He was a graduate of the College of William & Mary and obtained his education in the law at the University of Virginia. He began practice in West Virginia. When the American Civil War broke out he entered the Confederate States Army, eventually becoming Colonel of the 36th Virginia Infantry Regiment. At the close of the war he resumed his law practice, locating in Fauquier County, Virginia. On one occasion, William Elam, editor of the Richmond Whig, severely criticized Governor Smith editorially, leading Smith to challenge Elam to a duel, in which Elam was wounded in the chin. Smith served one term as judge of Fauquier County, and was later a member of the Virginia House of Delegates. In 1884, President Grover Cleveland appointed Smith United States Attorney for New Mexico, an office he filled four years, when he returned to Virginia to resume private practice.

In 1893, Smith was appointed by President Cleveland as chief justice of the New Mexico Territorial Supreme Court, presiding over the fourth district for five years; he was succeeded in both posts by Chief Justice William J. Mills. Smith "gained a reputation for courage and fairness in the performance of his duties on the bench", and was described as "a fine classical scholar and a man of varied accomplishments". While serving as chief justice, Smith once ordered a sheriff to arrest a certain lawyer, and when the sheriff failed to follow instructions Smith "left the bench and arrested the attorney himself". Following his service on the bench, Smith moved to Warrenton, Virginia.

Smith died in Richmond, Virginia, at the age of 84. He was buried in Hollywood Cemetery.

Political offices
Preceded by James O'Brien	Justice of the New Mexico Territorial Supreme Court; 1893–1898	Succeeded by William J. Mills
