= Frank Bois =

Canadian sailor

- Born: September 13, 1841; Quebec City, Canada East
- Died: January 25, 1920 (aged 78) Orting, Washington
- Buried: Grand Army of the Republic Cemetery, Seattle, Washington
- Allegiance: United States of America
- Branch: United States Army; United States Navy
- Service years: 1861–1862 (USA); 1862–1863 (USN)
- Rank: Private (USA); Quartermaster (USN)
- Conflicts: Siege of Vicksburg
- Awards: Medal of Honor

Frank Bois (or Boise) (September 13, 1841 – January 25, 1920) was a Canadian sailor who fought in the American Civil War. He received the U.S. military's highest decoration, the Medal of Honor, for his actions during the Siege of Vicksburg on May 27, 1863, while serving as Quartermaster aboard the USS Cincinnati.

Bois initially joined the 10th Massachusetts Infantry from Northampton, Massachusetts, in June 1861. He was transferred to the US Navy in September 1862, and discharged a year later.

Bois died on January 25, 1920, and is buried in Seattle, Washington.

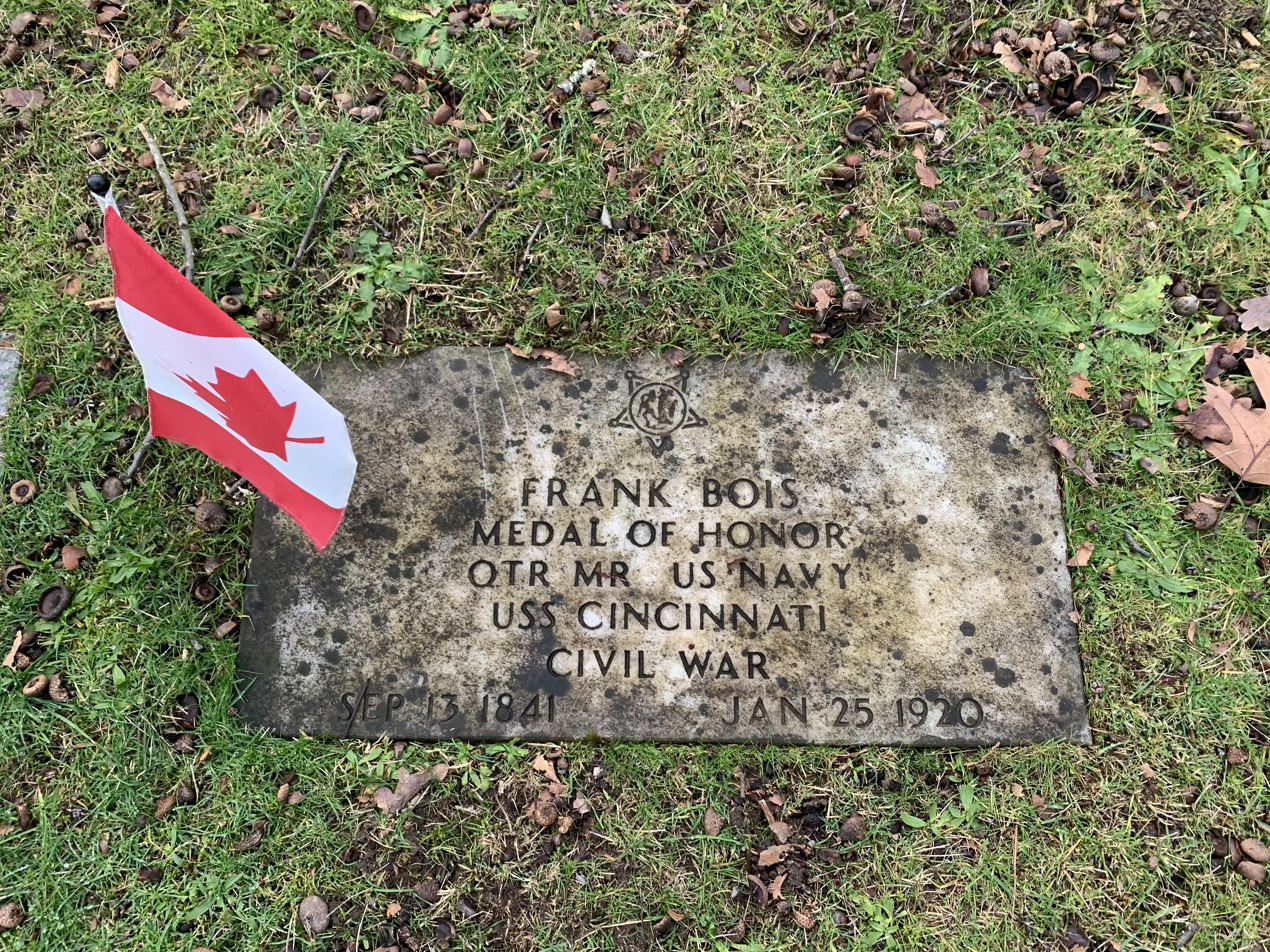
Frank Bois is interred at the Grand Army of the Republic Cemetery in Seattle, WA

== Medal of Honor citation ==
Served as quartermaster on board the U.S.S. Cincinnati during the attack on the Vicksburg batteries and at the time of her sinking, 27 May 1863. Engaging the enemy in a fierce battle, the Cincinnati, amidst an incessant fire of shot and shell, continued to fire her guns to the last, though so penetrated by enemy shellfire that her fate was sealed. Conspicuously cool in making signals throughout the battle, Bois, after all the Cincinnati's staffs had been shot away, succeeded in nailing the flag to the stump of the forestaff to enable this proud ship to go down, "with her colors nailed to the mast."

== See also ==
- List of American Civil War Medal of Honor recipients: A–F
