= Grand Army of the Republic Cemetery (Portland, Oregon) =

Cemetery for American Civil War veterans in Portland, Oregon, US

- Interactive map of Grand Army of the Republic Cemetery

Details
- Established: 1882
- Location: Portland, Oregon
- Country: United States
- Coordinates: 45°27′42″N 122°40′46″W
- Type: Public
- Owned by: Metro
- No. of graves: 700+
- Website: Grand Army of the Republic Cemetery from the Metro website

The Grand Army of the Republic Cemetery is a cemetery for American Civil War veterans in the U.S. city of Portland, Oregon. It is located at S.W. Palatine Hill Road and S.W. Boones Ferry Road, next to River View Cemetery.

Fourteen Union Civil War veterans, members of the Grand Army of the Republic, formed the Grand Army Cemetery Association and purchased the cemetery in 1882. The Daughters of Union Veterans of the Civil War took over the management and administration of the cemetery at that time.

Ownership of the cemetery eventually passed to the State of Oregon in 1961 then to Multnomah County, Oregon in 1971. In 1996 ownership was granted to Metro Regional Parks and Greenspaces. The oldest marker is dated October 15, 1889.

Salmon Brown, son of John Brown (of the song "John Brown's Body") is buried here, as is Hartwell B. Compson (1842–1905), who received the Medal of Honor for heroism in the Civil War.

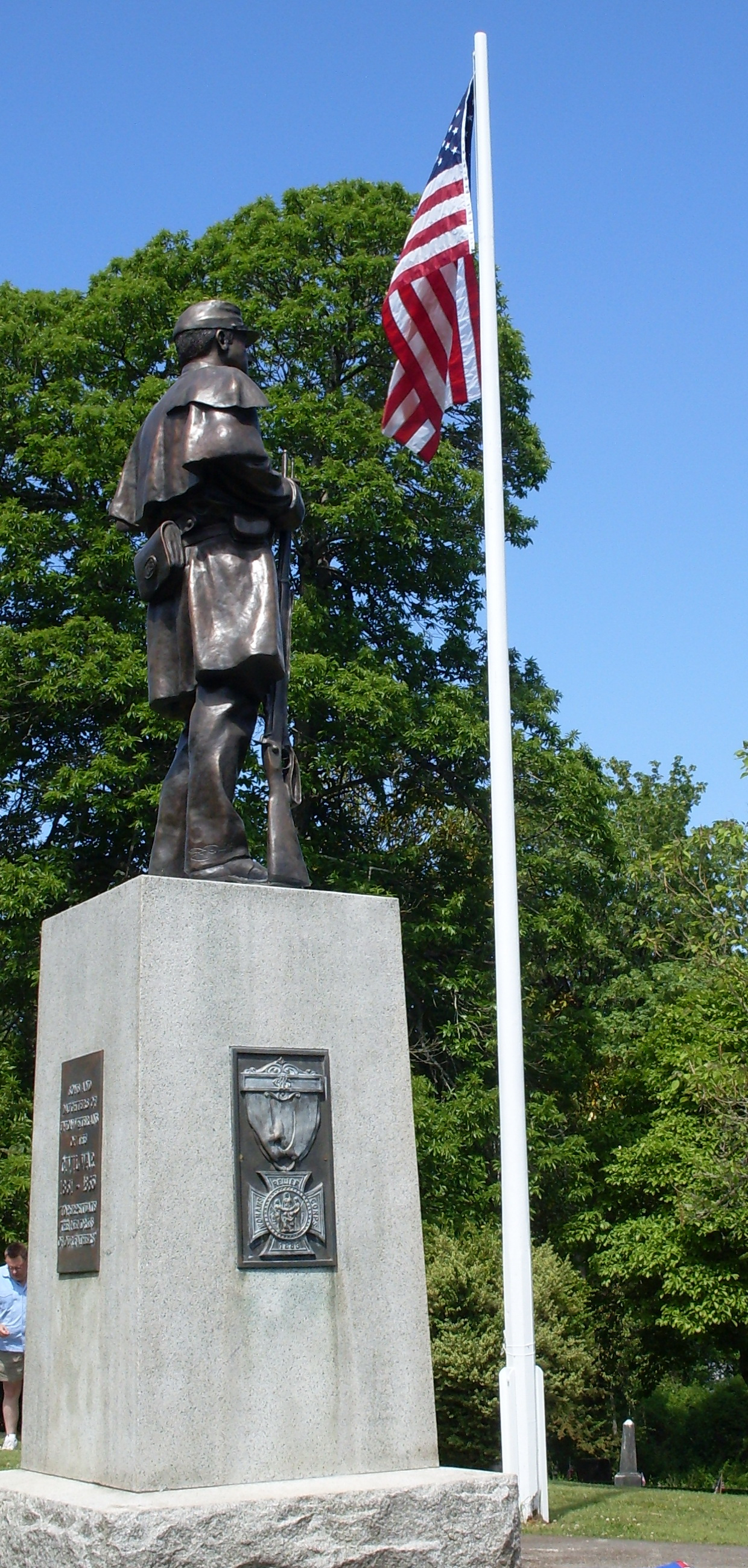

== See also ==
- Grand Army of the Republic Cemetery (Seattle)
