= Christopher C. Bruton =

Irish-American soldier (1841–1867)

- Born: 1841; Ireland
- Died: August 17, 1867; Caledonia Township, Michigan, U.S.
- Military career
- Allegiance: United States
- Branch: United States Army; Union Army
- Service years: 1861 - 1862, 1864 - 1865
- Rank: Captain; Brevet Major
- Unit: (New York (state)) 22nd Regiment New York Volunteer Cavalry
- Conflicts: American Civil War • Battle of Waynesboro, Virginia
- Awards: Medal of Honor

Christopher C. Bruton (or Braton) (1841–1867) was a Union Army officer during the American Civil War. He received the Medal of Honor for gallantry during the Battle of Waynesboro, Virginia fought on March 2, 1865. It was the final battle for Confederate Lt. Gen. Jubal Early, whose force was destroyed.

Bruton joined the 18th New York Infantry in May 1861, and was discharged for disability in August 1862. He joined the 22nd New York Cavalry in January 1864, and was commissioned as an officer the following March. He mustered out with his regiment in August 1865.

== Medal of Honor citation ==
"The President of the United States of America, in the name of Congress, takes pleasure in presenting the Medal of Honor to Captain (Cavalry) Christopher C. Bruton, United States Army, for extraordinary heroism on 2 March 1865, while serving with Company C, 22d New York Cavalry, in action at Waynesboro, Virginia, for capture of General Early's headquarters flag, Confederate national standard."

The Medal was awarded on March 26, 1865. Colonel Hartwell B. Compson of the 8th New York Cavalry is also credited with the capture of this flag.

The captured flag was a Confederate Second National flag measuring 4’ x 6’ and was presented by Compson to the Secretary of War. The Federal government returned the flag to Virginia in 1906. It is in the possession of The Museum of the Confederacy in Richmond. He died August 17, 1867 - cause of death - Consumption and is buried in St. Patrick's Cemetery in Bowne Twp., Kent County, Michigan. Place of death was in Caledonia Twp. at the home of his brother, Patrick, who was also a Civil War Veteran. His death certificate was issued by the State of Michigan, County of Kent recorded liber 1, page 009, record number 176.

== See also ==
- List of Medal of Honor recipients
- List of American Civil War Medal of Honor recipients: A-F
