= 63rd Virginia Infantry Regiment =

- Flag of Virginia, 1861
- Active: May 1862 – Spring 1865
- Disbanded: 1865
- Country: Confederacy
- Allegiance: Confederate States of America
- Branch: Confederate States Army
- Type: Infantry
- Engagements: American Civil War: Battle of Charleston; Battle of Chickamauga; Atlanta campaign; Battle of Nashville; Battle of Bentonville

Commanders
- Notable commanders: Colonel John J. McMahon; Lt. Colonel David C. Dunn; Colonel James M. French; Lt. Colonel Connally H. Lynch

The 63rd Virginia Infantry Regiment was a Confederate regiment during the American Civil War.

== Organization ==
It was organized May 24, 1862, with 10 companies, A to K, all enlisted for 3 years or the duration of the war. These companies were raised under an order from the Secretary of War, April 9, 1862, to Major John J. McMahon. McMahon was rewarded by being made Colonel of the 63rd in May, when the regiment was formally organized at Abingdon in Washington County, Virginia.

Colonel McMahon was succeeded by Lieutenant Colonel David C. Dunn. Major James M. French, who was later promoted to Colonel, succeeded Colonel Dunn. The 63rd ended the war with Captain (later Lieutenant Colonel) Connally H. Lynch in command. Lynch was also commander of the 54th Battalion, a consolidation of the 54th and 63rd Virginia Infantry regiments.

== Service ==
The 63rd saw action in ten states, and by the time of its surrender on April 26, 1865, at Durham Station, North Carolina, it had fought in over 70 engagements, including the Kanawha Valley Campaign of 1862, Chickamauga, Missionary Ridge, Chattanooga, Ringold Gap, Resaca, Peachtree Creek, New Hope Church, Kennesaw Mountain, Franklin, and Stones River, among others.

After it became a part of the Army of Tennessee, the 63rd served under, at different times, James Longstreet, Patrick Cleburne, Nathan Bedford Forrest, William J. Hardee, Stephen D. Lee, and Daniel Harvey Hill.

== See also ==
- List of Virginia Civil War units
