= 8th New York Cavalry Regiment =

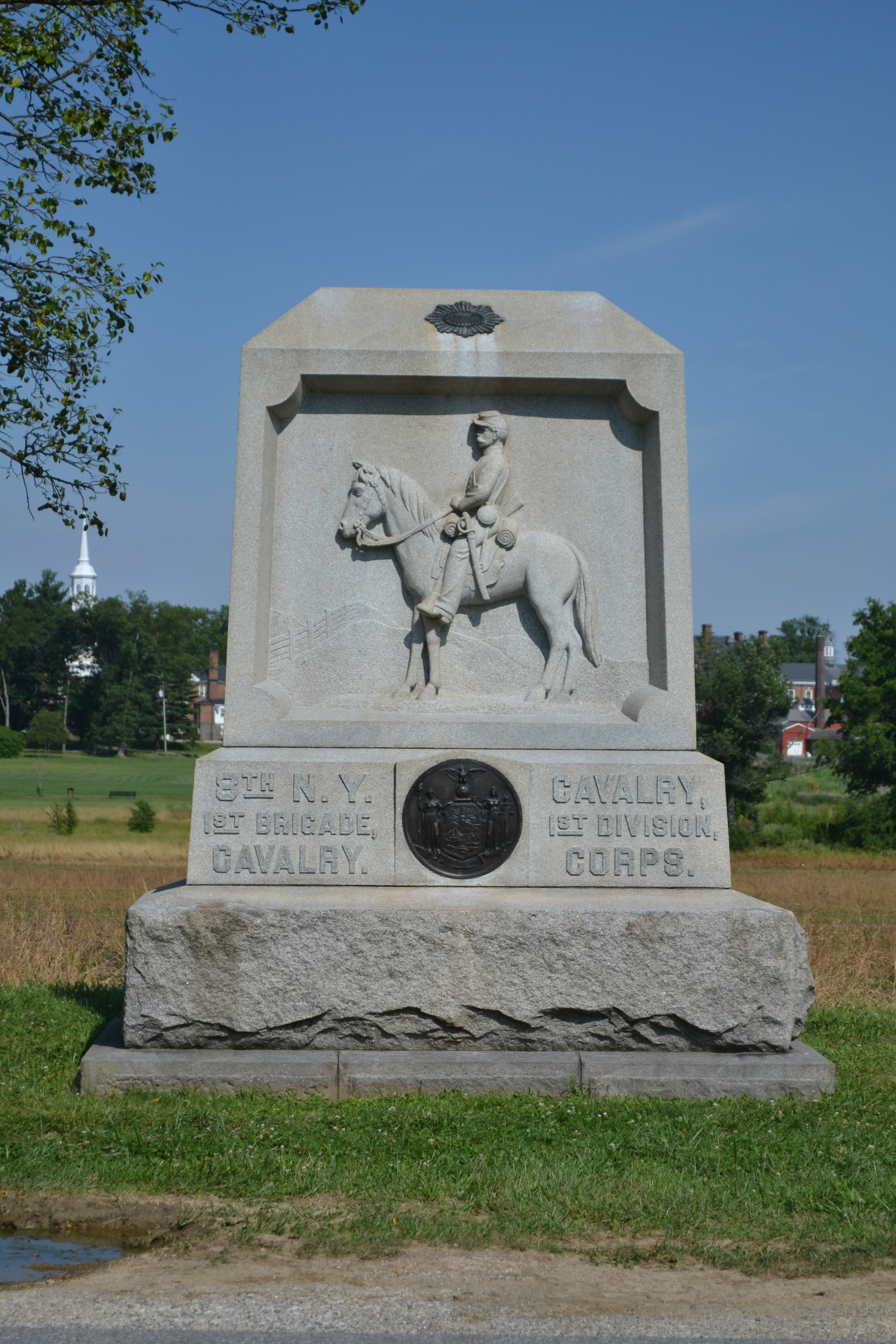
A monument to the 8th New York Volunteer Cavalry at Gettysburg National Military Park, the site of the Battle of Gettysburg, the bloodiest and possibly most influential American Civil War battle

The 8th New York Cavalry Regiment, also known as the "Rochester Regiment," was a regiment of the Union Army that fought during the American Civil War. It was a volunteer unit organized in Rochester on November 14, 1861, and left the state on November 29. It was mustered out on June 27, 1865.

== Service ==
The regiment served at various times in the defense of the national capital in Washington D.C., in the Department of the Shenandoah, in the Middle Department, and in the Army of the Potomac.

On June 27, 1865, when the regiment mustered out, it was commanded by Colonel Edmund Mann Pope. In total, the regiment lost 324 men, including 19 officers and 305 enlisted men during the American Civil War.

Major Hartwell B. Compson, Second Lieutenant Andrew Kuder, Second Lieutenant Robert Niven, Sergeant James Congdon, Sergeant Charles A. Goheen, Sergeant Daniel Kelly, and Corporal Henry H. Bickford all received the Medal of Honor for their actions during the Battle of Waynesboro, Virginia on March 2, 1865.

First Lieutenant Morton A. Read received the Medal of Honor for capturing the flag from the 1st Texas Infantry during the Battle of Appomattox Station on April 8, 1865. The flag had the Stars and Bars design.

== See also ==
- List of New York Civil War regiments
