= Edmund Mann Pope =

American politician (1837–1906)

Edmund Mann Pope (February 21, 1837 – June 5, 1906) was an American businessman, soldier and politician.

Pope was born in Penfield, New York, and went to the public schools. Pope served in Union Army during the American Civil War, being commissioned Captain in the 8th New York Cavalry Regiment in 1861. He served with the unit throughout the war, becoming a prisoner of war at the Battle of Funkstown during the Gettysburg campaign. He rejoined his regiment after being exchanged and became its Colonel in March 1865. In the aftermath of the war he was brevetted brigadier general. In 1873, he moved to Minnesota and settled in Mankato, Minnesota, with his wife and family. Pope worked as a merchant. He served in the Minnesota Senate from 1887 to 1890 and was a Democrat. He died in Grand Marais, Minnesota.

== See also ==
- List of American Civil War brevet generals (Union)
