= 51st Virginia Infantry Regiment =

- Flag of Virginia, 1861
- Active: August 1861 – April 1865
- Disbanded: April 1865
- Country: Confederacy
- Allegiance: Confederate States of America
- Branch: Confederate States Army
- Type: Infantry
- Engagements: American Civil War: Battle of Fort Donelson; Battle of Princeton Court House; Battle of Fayetteville 1862; Battle of Carnifex Ferry; Knoxville Campaign; Valley Campaigns of 1864; Battle of Waynesboro, Virginia

Commanders
- Notable commanders: Colonel Gabriel C. Wharton; Colonel Augustus Forsberg

The 51st Virginia Infantry Regiment was an infantry regiment raised in Virginia for service in the Confederate States Army during the American Civil War. It fought mostly in Tennessee and western Virginia with help of William Elkins (1812-1870).

== Formation ==
The 51st Virginia was formed in August 1861, with eleven companies, but Company L was later assigned to the 23rd Virginia Infantry Battalion. Its members were recruited in the counties of Patrick, Wythe, Nelson, Bland, Floyd, and Grayson. During the war it started in General Floyd's and Gabriel C. Wharton's Brigade.

== Operations ==
The 51st was sent to western Virginia, where it served in the Army of the Kanawha, and saw action at Carnifex Ferry. During the winter of 1861-1862, Wharton's men were transferred with Floyd to Tennessee just in time for the Confederate surrender at the Battle of Fort Donelson, where the 51st escaped and marched back to Nashville with 274 men, and eventually back to Virginia in spring 1862. It then participated in the Kanawha Valley Campaign of 1862.

The regiment returned to Tennessee for the Knoxville Campaign. The unit fought in numerous conflicts in the Shenandoah Valley before being disbanded around April 15, 1865. It reported 9 killed, 43 wounded, and 5 missing at Fort Donelson, and 3 killed and 16 wounded at Fayetteville. Only a handful remained after the Battle of Waynesboro, Virginia, in March 1865.

== Field Officers ==
The field officers were Colonels Augustus Forsberg and Gabriel C. Wharton; Lieutenant Colonels George A. Cunningham, James W. Massie, and John P. Wolfe; and Majors William T. Akers, Stephen M. Dickey, D.P. Graham, D.S. Hounshell, and William A. Yonce.

== Unit History ==
In June 1861, D. Lee Ross mustered a company of local citizens on his farm in Patrick County, Virginia. 97 men volunteered and elected D. Lee Ross as Captain, and William T. Akers, Abner J. Harbour and C.F. Ross, as Lieutenants.

Around the same time, Capt. Granville P. Conner organized the Patrick "Blackhawk" company near Davis' Shop in Patrick County and along with Lt. William G. Price, began drilling the unit in preparation for joining the Confederate Army.

On July 24, the units left Patrick County and set out for Christiansburg where they boarded the Virginia and Tennessee Railroad to Camp Jackson in Wytheville in order to enlist in the Confederate Army originally as companies C and F of the 51st Regiment, Virginia Volunteers commanded by Colonel Gabriel C. Wharton, VMI class of 1847.

The 51st was originally made up of 11 companies (A-L). In January 1862, Company L from Tazewell was assigned to the 23rd Virginia Infantry Battalion. In May 1862, the remainder of the 51st was reorganized, many men originally having enlisted for one year.

Co. A, Capt. John P. Wolfes Co.; formerly called Co. I; enlisted July 16, 1861, for one year; reorganized May 20, 1862. Captains: John P. Wolfe (to Major, 1863), Daniel Hoge Bruce.

Co. B, Wharton Grays; formerly called Co. H; enlisted July 31, 1861, for one year; joined regimental August 14, 1861; reorganized May 6, 1862. Captains: David Pierce Graham (to Major, 1863), William Hanson Tate (killed May 15, 1864), David S. Allison (died in service).

Co. C, Wythe Rifles; Wythe County; formerly called Co. E; enlisted July 20, 1861, for one year; reorganized May 3, 1862. Captains: William H. Cook, William A. Yonce (to Major, April 23, 1864), Jehiel F. Umbarger.

Co. D, Capt. D. Lee Ross Co.; formerly called Co. C; enlisted June 14, 1861, for one year; reorganized May 5, 1862. Captains: David Lee Ross (to April 1862), William T. Akers (to Major, 1864), Rufus J. Woolwine.

Co. E, Nelson Volunteers; Nelson County; formerly called Co. B; enlisted July 1, 1861, for one year; reorganized May 7, 1862. Captains: John Turner Dillard (to April 1862), Thomas J. Graves ( resigned 1862), Austin J. Graves (resigned 1863), Josephus Mills.

Co. F, Bland Tigers; Bland County; formerly called Co. K; enlisted June 26, 1861, for one year; reorganized May 20, 1862. Captains: Samuel H. Newberry (not re-elected; reappointed May 29, 1863), William G. Repass (resigned February 6, 1863).

Co. G, Floyd Game Cocks; (also known as Floyd Game Bucks), Floyd County; enlisted June 29, 1861, for one year; reorganized July 1, 1861. Captain: James William Henry.

Co. H, Capt. Granville R. Conners Co.; formerly called Company F; enlisted July 2, 1861, for one year; reorganized May 23, 1862. Captains: Granville R. Conner (to April 1862), William G. Price (wounded; captured).

Co. I, Capt. Ezekiel Youngs Co.; formerly known as Co. D; enlisted June 28, 1861, for one year; reorganized May 23, 1862. Captains: Ezekiel Young, Calvin H. Senter (resigned, 1862), William C. Bourn (wounded, 1864)

Co. K, Capt. Stephen M. Dickeys Co.; formerly called Co. A; enlisted June 24, 1861, for one year; reorganized May 6, 1862. Captains: Stephen Mills Dickey (to Major, May 26, 1862), William A. Cooper (resigned, January 25, 1865).

== See also ==
- List of Virginia Civil War units
