= 30th Virginia Sharpshooters Battalion =

30th Battalion Virginia Sharpshooters
- Flag of Virginia, 1861
- Active: September 1, 1862 – March 2, 1865
- Disbanded: March 1865
- Allegiance: Confederate States of America
- Branch: Confederate States Army
- Type: Infantry
- Role: Sharpshooters
- Size: Battalion
- Engagements: American Civil War: Western Virginia Campaign; Battle of Fort Donelson; Battle of Fayetteville 1862; Battle of Cold Harbor; Valley Campaigns of 1864; Battle of Cedar Creek; Battle of Waynesboro

The 30th Virginia Sharpshooters Battalion was a unit of the Confederate States Army during the American Civil War.

== Predecessors ==
The 30th Battalion, Virginia Sharpshooters was created in 1862 from the remains of three artillery batteries with the addition of three further companies made up of transfers. Companies A and B were composed of men from Captain Stephen Adams' Gauley Artillery and Captain Napoleon B. French's Battery. Both units served under General John B. Floyd from the beginning of the war until surrendering at Battle of Fort Donelson.

== Battalion Formation to Surrender ==
Both batteries were exchanged and formed in August 1862 before becoming part of the 30th Battalion, Virginia Sharpshooters in September of that year. The men were recruited primarily from the counties of Roane, Raleigh, Mercer, Monroe, Washington, and Carroll. They spent the next several years in the Department of East Tennessee and West Virginia moving between those locations as a part of General G.C. Wharton's brigade. Sent as reinforcements to General John C. Breckinridge the battalion fought at New Market. Wharton's brigade was again moved east, fighting at Cold Harbor before returning west with General Jubal Early's Second Corps to stop Maj. Gen. David Hunter from destroying the vital supply center at Lynchburg, Virginia.

The battalion was part of General Jubal Early's Army of the Valley for the rest of its service fighting in all major battles during the raid on Washington, DC and the retreat from it. Survivors of the 30th Battalion, Virginia Sharpshooters surrendered with almost all of Early's remaining army after the Battle of Waynesboro, Virginia on March 2, 1865.

== Officers ==
During the battalion's service its field officers included Lieutenant Colonel John Lyle Clark and Major Peter J. Otey. Company commanders included Captain Stephen Adams, Captain Napoleon B. French, Captain Lewis A. Vawter, Captain Charles E. Vawter, Captain R.C. Hoffman, and Captain L.C. Armstrong. Most if not all the officers and men were from counties that became part of West Virginia.

== See also ==
- List of Virginia Civil War units
- List of West Virginia Civil War Confederate units
