= Gabriel C. Wharton =

American politician

Gabriel Colvin Wharton
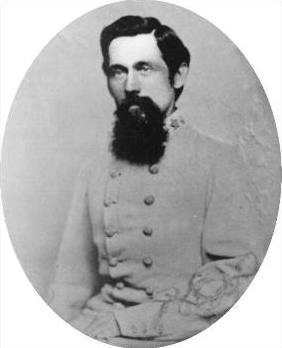
- Born: July 23, 1824; Culpeper County, Virginia
- Died: May 12, 1906 (aged 81); Radford, Virginia
- Burial place: Radford Family Cemetery Radford, Virginia
- Military career
- Allegiance: Confederate States of America
- Branch: Confederate States Army
- Service years: 1861–65
- Rank: Brigadier General
- Nickname: Gabe
- Conflicts: American Civil War

Gabriel Colvin Wharton (July 23, 1824 – May 12, 1906) was an American civil engineer and soldier who served as a general in the Confederate Army during the American Civil War. After the war he was a politician and later resumed his engineering work.

== Early life and career ==
Wharton was born in Culpeper County, Virginia, in the summer of 1824. He entered Virginia Military Institute in Lexington on September 1, 1845. Wharton graduated on July 5, 1847, finishing second out of 12 cadets as a "distinguished graduate."

After leaving Virginia Military Institute Wharton became a civil engineer. Later moving to the Arizona Territory to take up work as a mining engineer.

== Civil War service ==
At the start of the American Civil War in 1861, Wharton chose to follow his home state of Virginia and the Confederate cause, and joined the Confederate Army. He was appointed a major in the 45th Virginia Infantry on July 1, and soon afterward was given command of the 51st Virginia Infantry on July 17, with the rank of colonel.

1864 Battle of New Market

The 51st Virginia was part of Maj. Gen. John B. Floyd's operations in western Virginia, and escaped with Floyd on February 14, 1862, during the Battle of Fort Donelson in Tennessee, just prior to the fort's surrender to Brig. Gen. Ulysses S. Grant. In September, he led a brigade in the Kanawha Valley Campaign of 1862. Wharton was later sent to the Western Theater, and commanded several brigades in various Confederate departments from February to September 1864.

During the Civil War, Pack's Ferry was a strategic river crossing for Federal troops in the area. On the morning of August 6, 1862, 900 men and 2 artillery guns of Confederate Col. G. C. Wharton's command fired on 23rd Ohio soldiers under Maj. Comly. Although the fight threatened Union control of the crossing, the Ohioans held until reinforcements neared and Wharton's men withdrew. Wharton was promoted to brigadier general, effective July 8, 1863.

In 1863, he married Nannie Radford, and they had one child together, a son named William.

In the winter of 1863, Wharton served in Lt. Gen. James Longstreet's operations against Knoxville, Tennessee, which were ultimately unsuccessful and ended in the spring of 1864.

Wharton then returned to the Eastern Theater and was given divisional command in the Second Corps, Army of Northern Virginia. Wharton also took part in the Battle of New Market on May 15. His brigade was part of Maj. Gen. John C. Breckinridge's force, fighting on the left during the Confederate victory at New Market.

1865 Battle of Waynesboro

In 1864 Wharton participated in the Overland Campaign, fighting in Breckinridge's division in the Confederate victory at Battle of Cold Harbor from May 31 – June 12. His brigade also participated in the Battle of Monocacy on July 9.

Wharton was part of Lt. Gen. Jubal Early's operations in his Valley Campaigns, and he participated in the Confederate defeat at the Battle of Cedar Creek on October 19. He also fought in the Battle of Waynesboro, Virginia, on March 2, 1865, at the end of which his command was largely dispersed and Early's army virtually destroyed. Wharton led what was left of his division until May 2. He was paroled at the end of the war from Lynchburg, Virginia, on June 4.

== Postwar ==
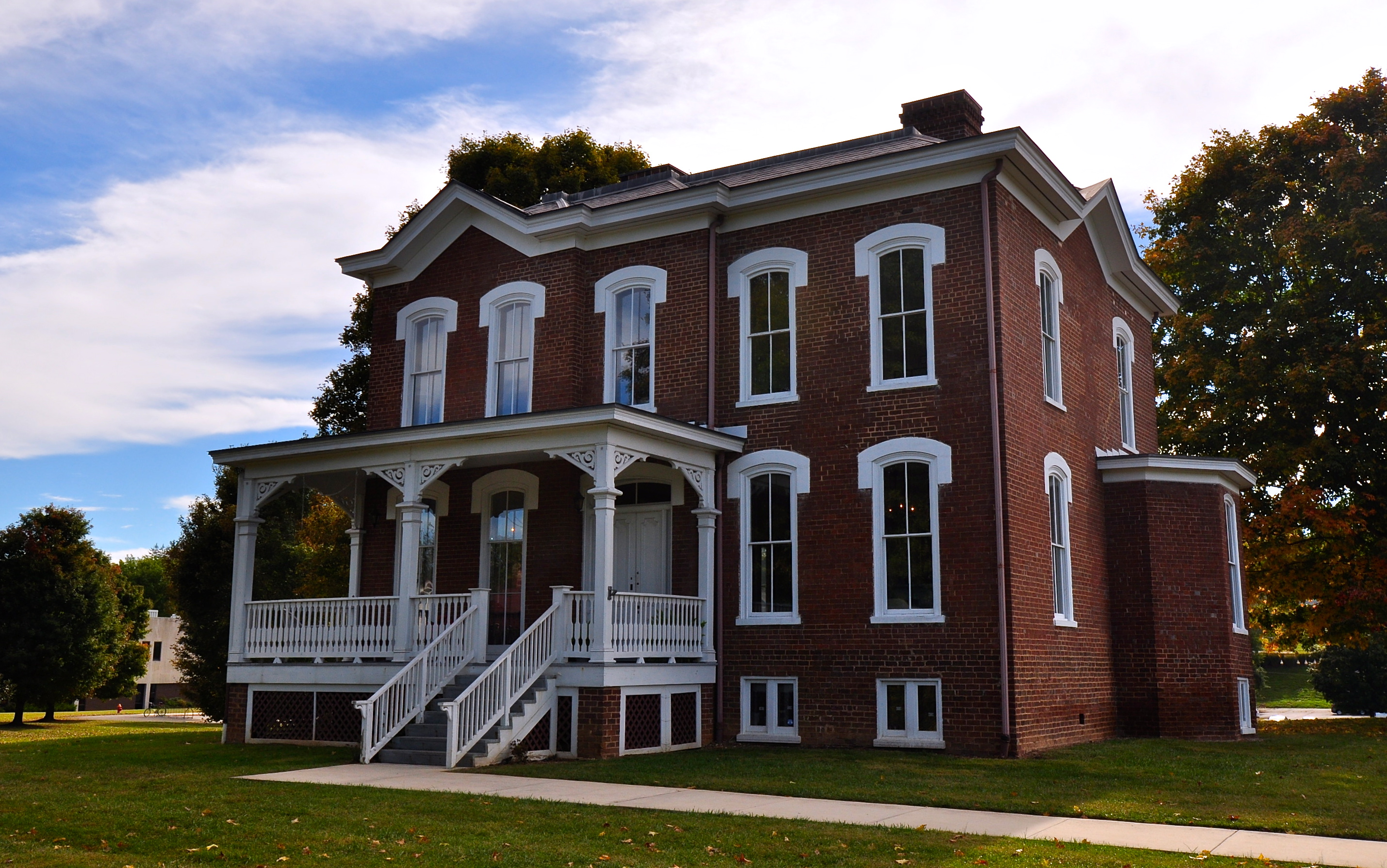
Glencoe, postbellum home of Wharton

Wharton became a legislator in the Virginia General Assembly and then returned to his pre-war career as a mining engineer. He was also instrumental in building the railroad in Southwest Virginia in New River Valley.

Wharton married Nannie Radford, daughter of John Blair Radford, for whom the town of Radford, Virginia, is named. Wharton was also instrumental in the building of the New River Railroad, Mining and Manufacturing Company.

Wharton died in the spring of 1906 at Radford, Virginia, at the age of 81, and was buried in the Radford family cemetery located in Radford. He resided at Glencoe in Radford, listed in the National Register of Historic Places in 2000.

== See also ==
- List of American Civil War generals (Confederate)
