= Simmonds' Battery Kentucky Light Artillery =

- Active: June 3, 1861 to July 20, 1865
- Country: United States
- Allegiance: Union
- Branch: Artillery
- Engagements: Battle of Princeton Court House; Battle of South Mountain; Battle of Antietam; Battle of Cloyd's Mountain

Simmonds' Battery Kentucky Light Artillery was an artillery battery that served in the Union Army during the American Civil War. It was sometimes referred to as the 1st Kentucky Independent Battery, and has the distinction of being the only Kentucky unit in U.S. service to serve in the eastern theater.

== Service ==
The battery was organized at Pendleton, Ohio from Company E, 1st Kentucky Infantry at a time when Kentucky was attempting to remain neutral. It was mustered in under the command of Captain Seth J. Simmonds.

The battery was attached to District of the Kanawha, West Virginia, to March 1862. 2nd Brigade, Kanawha Division West Virginia, to September 1862. 2nd Brigade, Kanawha Division, IX Corps, Army of the Potomac, to October 1862. District of the Kanawha, West Virginia, Department of the Ohio, to March 1863. 1st Brigade, 3rd Division, VIII Corps, Middle Department, to June 1863. 1st Brigade, Scammon's Division, Department of West Virginia, to December 1863. 3rd Brigade, 3rd Division West Virginia, to April 1864. Artillery, 2nd Infantry Division West Virginia, to July 1864. Reserve Division, Harper's Ferry, West Virginia, to April 1865. 2nd Brigade, 1st Infantry Division West Virginia, to July 1865.

Simmonds' Battery Kentucky Light Artillery mustered out of service on July 26, 1865.

== Detailed service ==
Duty at Pendleton, Ohio, until July 1861. Ordered to the Kanawha Valley, Va., July 10. March from Mt. Pleasant to Charleston, Va., July 11–25. Action at Scarry Creek July 17. Tyler Mountain July 24. Capture of Charleston July 25. Advance to Gauley July 26-August 1. Moved to Camp Piatt, arriving August 25. Gauley Bridge August 28. Boone Court House September 1. Peytonia September 12. Moved to Raleigh September 20–27. Chapmansville September 25. Return to Gauley, arriving there October 10. Cotton Hill October 13. Operations in Kanawha Valley October 19-November 16. Gauley Bridge October 23. Attack on Gauley by Floyd's Batteries November 1–9. Movement on Cotton Mountain and pursuit of Floyd November 1–18. Duty at Gauley Bridge until April 1862. Advance on Princeton April 22-May 4. At Flat Top Mountain until August. Wolf Creek May 15. Moved to Washington, D.C., August 14–23. Maryland Campaign September 6–22. Frederick, Md., September 12. Battles of South Mountain September 14, and Antietam September 16–17. Moved to Clarksburg, Suttonville, Summerville, Gauley Bridge and Kanawha Falls, W. Va., October 8-November 14, and duty there until April 1863, and at Camp White, Charleston, W. Va., until July. At Gauley Bridge until September. At Camp Toland, Charleston, W. Va., until January 1864. Scout to Boone Court House October 21–22, 1863. Expedition from Charleston to Lewisburg November 3–13. Capture of Lewisburg November 7. At Fayetteville until April 1864. Crook's Expedition against Virginia & Tennessee Railroad May 2–19. Action at Cloyd's Mountain May 9. New River Bridge May 10. Hunter's Raid on Lynchburg May 26-July 1. Lexington June 11. Diamond Hill June 17. Lynchburg June 17–18. Buford's Gap June 20. Salem June 21. At Camp Piatt and Harper's Ferry until August, and at Camp Fuller, Va., until June 1865.

== Casualties ==
The battery lost a total of 13 men during service; 3 enlisted men killed or mortally wounded, 10 enlisted men died of disease.

== Commanders ==
- Captain Seth J. Simmonds
- Captain Daniel W. Glassie

== See also ==
- List of Kentucky Civil War Units
- Kentucky in the Civil War
