= Eliakim P. Scammon =

Union Army general (1816–1894)

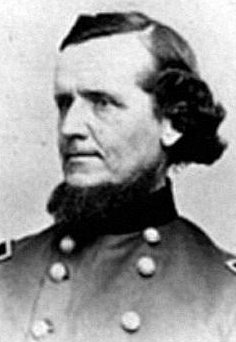
- Born: December 27, 1816; Whitefield, Maine
- Died: December 7, 1894 (aged 77); New York City, New York
- Burial place: Calvary Cemetery, Queens, New York
- Military career
- Allegiance: United States of America; Union
- Branch: United States Army; Union Army
- Service years: 1837–1856, 1861–1865
- Rank: Brigadier General
- Commands: Kanawha Division
- Conflicts: Seminole Wars; Mexican–American War; American Civil War; Battle of Carnifex Ferry; Battle of Princeton Courthouse; Battle of South Mountain; Battle of Antietam
- Other work: Professor

Eliakim Parker Scammon (December 27, 1816 – December 7, 1894) was a career officer in the United States Army, serving as a brigadier general in the Union Army during the American Civil War.

== Early life and career ==
Scammon, a native of Whitefield, Maine, was appointed from his district to the United States Military Academy in West Point, New York, graduating 9th in the Class of 1837. He remained at West Point after graduation, serving as Assistant Professor of Mathematics from August 1837 to September 1838. Due to his ranking and abilities, he was selected as one of the original officers in the newly created U.S. Army Corps of Topographic Engineers in 1838. He served in the Seminole Wars and the Mexican–American War, serving under Winfield Scott in the Army of Occupation. He was elevated to captain in 1853 and assigned to various surveying assignments, but was dismissed from the service on June 4, 1856.

He moved to Ohio and became Professor of Mathematics at Mount Saint Mary's College, and then was President and Professor of Mathematics, Polytechnic College of the Catholic Institute in Cincinnati. He had converted to Catholicism in 1846.

== Civil War service ==
With the outbreak of the Civil War, Scammon offered his services to William Dennison, the Governor of Ohio in June 1861 and was appointed as Colonel of the 23rd Ohio Infantry, commanding two men who would later become Presidents, Rutherford B. Hayes and William McKinley. The regiment saw action in western Virginia and then in the northern part of the state.

Assigned to what became the IX Corps in the Army of the Potomac, Scammon then commanded the 1st Brigade, Kanawha Division. During the Maryland Campaign, he led his men in an attack up the slopes of South Mountain. When Brig. Gen. Jacob D. Cox briefly assumed command of the IX Corps, Scammon temporarily commanded the Kanawha Division, while Col. Hugh Ewing commanded Scammon's brigade. He fought well at the Battle of Antietam, where his men were counterattacked by late-arriving Confederate reinforcements under A. P. Hill.

Scammon was appointed brigadier general of volunteers in October 1862, and fought in the major actions of the Kanawha Division. He often clashed with his subordinate, Rutherford B. Hayes. Scammon, by then a division commander, was captured by partisan guerrillas from the 16th Virginia Cavalry on February 3, 1864, when they raided a steamboat carrying General Scammon on the Kanawha River. He returned to duty in South Carolina after being exchanged. He was again captured along the South Carolina coast, but exchanged and when he returned to duty, was placed in command of a brigade in the Department of Florida. He was honorably mustered out in August 1865.

== Postbellum career ==
Following the war, he was the U.S. Consul to Prince Edward Island and then Professor of Mathematics at Seton Hall College in New Jersey. Bowdoin College in Maine conferred the honorary Degree of A. M. on Scammon.

Fort Scammon, a national historic landmark, on the outskirts of Charleston, West Virginia, was named after him. Scammon died in New York City. He was buried in the Calvary Cemetery in Long Island City, New York.

His brother, J. Young Scammon, became one of the wealthiest men in America as a Chicago attorney, newspaper owner, philanthropist and businessman. Another brother, Charles Melville Scammon is a famous whaleman, naturalist and author of Marine Mammals of the Northwestern Coast of North America (1874).

== See also ==
- List of American Civil War generals (Union)
- List of Ohio's American Civil War generals
- Ohio in the American Civil War
