= Battle of Kanawha Gap =

1861 battle of the American Civil War

Coordinates: 37.975°N 82.014°W

- Part of the American Civil War
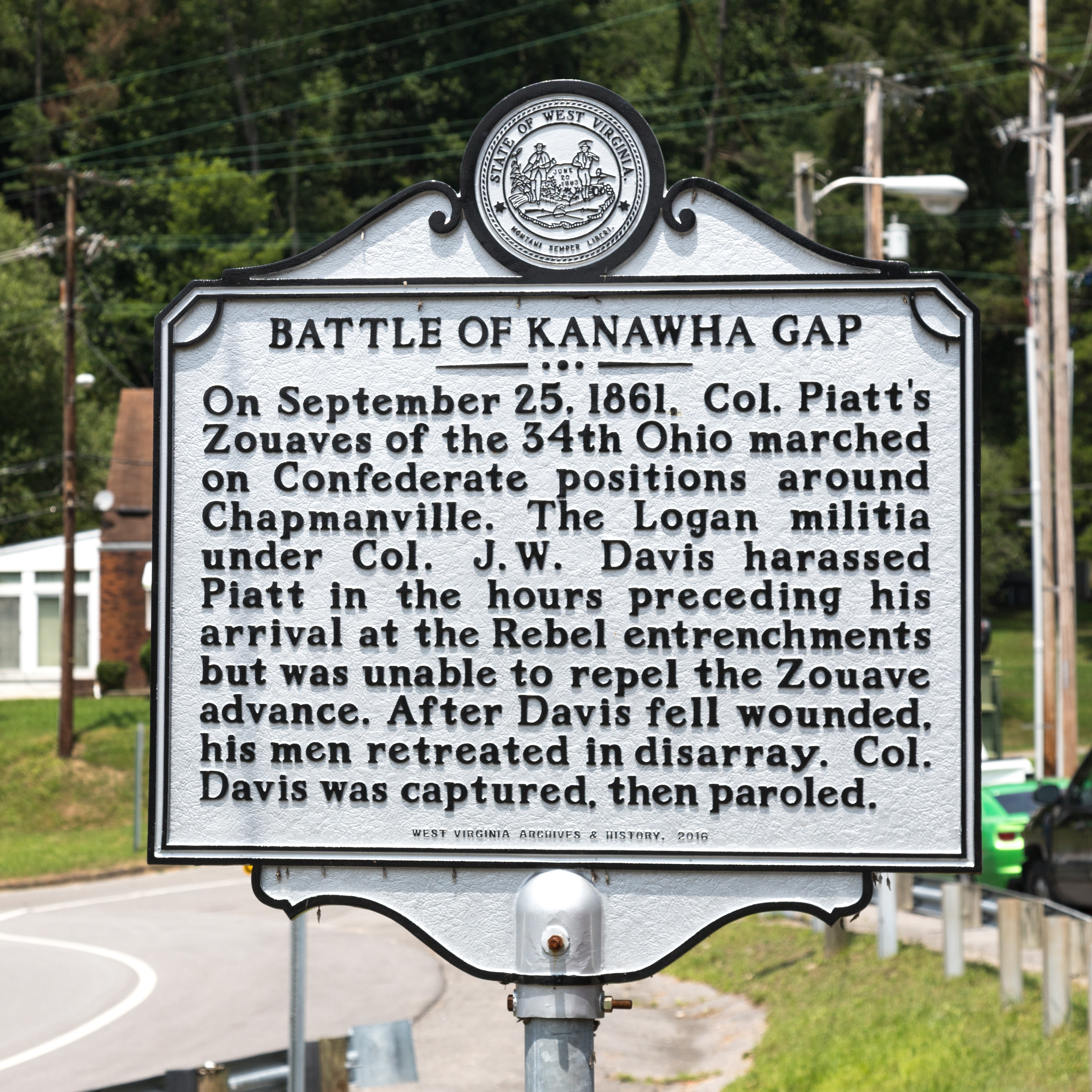
- Marker commemorating the Battle of Kanawha Gap
Date	September 25, 1861
Location	Kanawha Gap and Chapmanville, West Virginia
Result	Union victory

Belligerents
United States (Union)	(Confederate States of America) CSA (Confederacy)

Commanders and leaders
Col. Abram S. Piatt; Lt-Col. David A. Enyart; Lt-Col. John Toland	Col. J. Lucius Davis (w&c)

Units involved
34th Ohio Infantry; 1st Kentucky Infantry	Logan County Militia

Strength
750+	200+

Casualties and losses
4 killed 10+ wounded	60 killed and wounded 70+ captured

The Battle of Kanawha Gap, also known as the Battle of Chapmanville, was a Civil War battle fought near Chapmanville, West Virginia on September 25, 1861, as part of the Western Virginia campaign. A column of Union soldiers from the Kanawha Brigade commanded by Col. Piatt and Col. Enyart, set out on an expedition from Camp Enyart to attack a Confederate camp near Chapmanville and drive Confederate forces from the Kanawha valley.

== Background ==
Throughout the summer of 1861, Union forces under General Rosecrans had been fighting to gain control of the vital Kanawha Valley along western Virginia's border with Kentucky. The Kanawha valley was home to many southern sympathizers and secessionists and the Union wanted to take and hold the areas in Kanawha County around Charleston.

At the Battle of Scary Creek and Carnifex Ferry, Union forces had defeated the Confederates, and wanting to aid the operations of Jacob D. Cox, Colonel Abram Piatt decided to launch an expedition to attack the Confederate positions at Chapmanville.

== Order of Battle ==
Union Kanawha Brigade

- 34th Ohio Infantry (500 men)
- 1st Kentucky Infantry (300 men)
- Virginia Union Home Guards (100+ men)

Confederate Army of the Kanawha

- Logan County Militia (300 men)

== Battle ==
On September 22, 1861, Col. Piatt left Camp Enyart commanding 500 men of the 34th Ohio Infantry, while Lt-Col. Enyart commanded 300 men of the 1st Kentucky Infantry and 100 Loyal Home Guards from western Virginia. The column marched together until they reached Peytona, when the force was split in two, Col. Piatt's men continuing south while Lt-Col. Enyart's men marched along the Cole River but found no enemy forces. On September 24, the two columns reunited along the Kanawha River and encamped at Boone Court House.

The next day, September 25, the Union forces proceeded 16 miles towards Chapmanville when they encountered Confederate pickets and skirmishers at the Trace Fork Creek. The skirmishers were driven back towards Chapmanville, joining the main Confederate body, commanded by Col. J. Lucius Davis, in their fortifications and entrenchments in the Kanawha Gap just outside the town. While the main Confederate body, consisting of the Logan County Militia, was preparing their entrenchments at Kanawha Gap, Lt-Col. Enyart's men began to attack the militia on the outskirts of the town. The 1st Kentucky poured a deadly fire into the Confederates, completely routing the force in the town and killing or capturing over 50 men.

As the 1st Kentucky defeated the militia in the town, Col. Piatt's men marched towards the fortifications located on the side of a mountain at Kanawha Gap. The Confederate militia that managed to escape capture by the Kentuckians ran to the fortifications and the whole force opened fire when the Union column was approximately 80 yards from the foot of the mountain.

Piatt split his companies into three columns in order to flank the Confederate position. Companies A and C, under Capts. Rathbone and Miller, would attack up the right side of the mountain, flanking the Confederate left, while Company I, under Capt. Anderson, moved through a ravine on the left side of the mountain to flank the Confederate right. The rest of the 34th Ohio would attack up the center.

The three columns rapidly charged the fortifications and Capt. Anderson's Company I was the first to mount and capture the breastworks. The Union forces quickly captured the whole fortification, killing and wounding over 60 Confederates and capturing over 70, including Col. Davis who was severely wounded in the battle.

== Aftermath ==
The Union force lost 4 men killed and 10 wounded during the battle. The four men killed were all from the 34th Ohio:

- George Robinson, Company A
- Joseph Harvey, Company H
- Jeremiah Hullinger, Company I
- Jefferson Black, Company I

Following the battle, the Confederate militia abandoned much of the Kanawha Valley, and Col. Piatt's men and Lt-Col. Enyart's men returned to camp.

The Kanawha Valley would remain for the most part in Union hands, and in 1862 the Kanawha Division, of which the 34th Ohio would be part, continued to battle Confederate forces, including at the Battle of Princeton Court House.
