= Army of the Kanawha =

- Active: June 6, 1861–December 26, 1861
- Disbanded: Incorporated into Army of Central Kentucky December 26, 1861
- Country: Confederate States of America
- Branch: Confederate States Army
- Engagements: Battle of Kessler's Cross Lanes; Battle of Carnifex Ferry; Battle of Kanawha Gap

Commanders
- Notable commanders: Henry A. Wise John B. Floyd

The Army of the Kanawha was a small Confederate army early in the American Civil War.

Confederate units in the vital Kanawha River valley of western Virginia were styled the "Army of the Kanawha" after they were put under the command of former Virginia governor Henry A. Wise on June 6, 1861. Kanawha valley native John B. Floyd, himself a former Virginia governor and former U.S. Secretary of War, assumed command on August 11 intending to improve recruitment, but personal animosity between the two politicians prevented Floyd from fully exercising control of the inexperienced force until early autumn.

After the Confederate commanders' quarrel cost them victory at the Battle of Carnifex Ferry, Confederate States Secretary of War Judah P. Benjamin sent an order relieving Wise and ordering him to Richmond, and Floyd commanded the brigade-sized force until he was sent to the Western Theater. The "Army" was incorporated into the 3rd division of the Army of Central Kentucky in late December and while the army ceased to exist as such, the brigade fought at Fort Donelson. What men remained after the Confederate surrender at Donelson eventually became members of the Army of Mississippi before the Battle of Shiloh.

== Units and strength ==
By the end of May 1861, Cols. John McCausland and Christopher Q. Tompkins had enlisted nearly 1,000 men at Kanawha Court House, Kanawha County. From these men and subsequent recruits Tompkins organized the 1st Kanawha regiment, designated later as the 22nd Virginia Infantry and McCausland organized the 2nd Kanawha regiment, designated later as the 36th Virginia Infantry. By July 8 General Henry A. Wise had assembled at Charleston "a force of 2,600 men, consisting of the 1st and 2nd Kanawha regiments, the Kanawha battalion, seven independent companies of infantry, and three companies of mounted rangers. Reinforcements from his legion soon arrived, so that a few days later he had about 4,000 men, with ten small pieces of artillery."

Among later recruits in August 1861 were 300 men from Boone and Logan counties who were enlisted in the yet to be organized 3rd Kanawha regiment, designated later as the 60th Virginia Infantry, led by Col. Beuhring H. Jones.
