= Crockett's Cove Presbyterian Church =

Historic church in Virginia, US

- U.S. National Register of Historic Places
- Virginia Landmarks Register
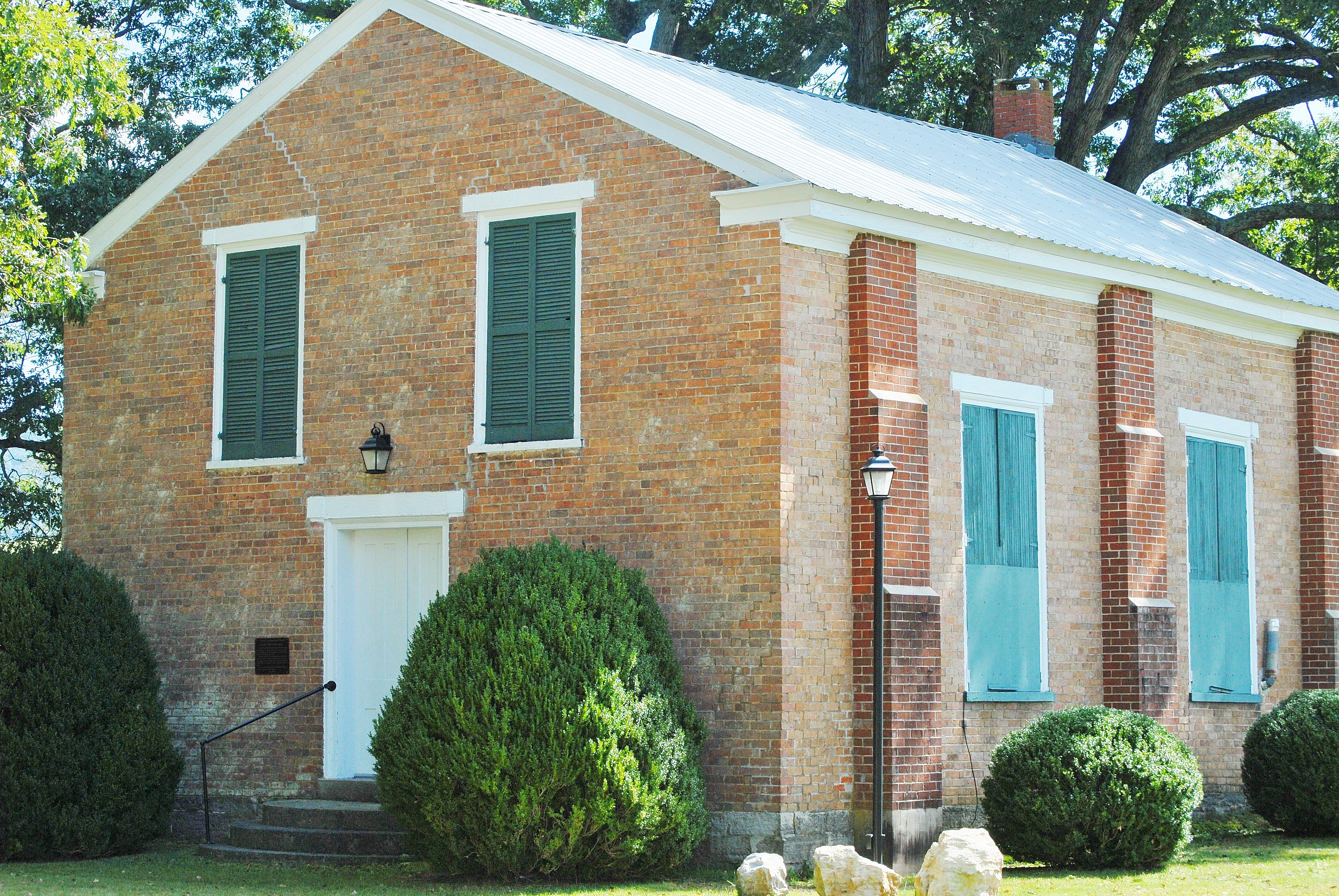

- Location within Virginia Location within the United States
- Location: VA 600 E of jct. with VA 603, near Wytheville, Virginia
- Coordinates: 37°1′34″N 81°2′15″W
- Area: less than one acre
- Built: 1858
- Architect: Johnson, Wesley
- Architectural style: Greek Revival
- NRHP reference No.: 92001373
- VLR No.: 098-0027

Significant dates
- Added to NRHP: October 15, 1992
- Designated VLR: April 22, 1992

Crockett's Cove Presbyterian Church, also known as Cove Brick Church, is a historic Presbyterian church located near Wytheville, Wythe County, Virginia. The church was built in 1858, and is a small rectangular, Greek Revival style brick church building. The church served as a hospital following the Battle of Cove Mountain.

It was listed on the National Register of Historic Places in 1992.
