= Army of Central Kentucky =

Military organization in the Confederate States Army 1861-1862

- Battle flag of the army
- Active: September 18, 1861–March 29, 1862
- Disbanded: Incorporated into Army of the Mississippi March 29, 1862
- Country: Confederate States of America
- Branch: Confederate States Army
- Type: Field army
- Engagements: Battle of Belmont; Battle of Fort Henry; Battle of Fort Donelson

Commanders
- Notable commanders: Simon B. Buckner; Albert S. Johnston; William J. Hardee

The Army of Central Kentucky was a military organization within Department No. 2 (the Western Department of the Confederate States of America). Originally called the Army Corps of Central Kentucky, it was created in the fall of 1861 as a subsection of Department No. 2, and continued in existence until the end of March 1862 when it was absorbed and merged into the Army of Mississippi, which was then re-organized as the Army of Tennessee on November 20, 1862.

== Background ==
The Department No. 2 (Western Department) was created on June 25, 1861, under the command of Maj. Gen. Leonidas Polk, and had military jurisdiction and control over parts of Alabama, Tennessee, Arkansas, Mississippi, and Louisiana. On September 2, 1861, the department was expanded to include all of Arkansas and military operations in the state of Missouri, and then on September 10 the area was expanded again to include all of Arkansas, Tennessee, more of Mississippi, and all military operations in Kansas, Kentucky, Missouri, and any Indian territories rallying to the Confederate cause west of Arkansas and Missouri.

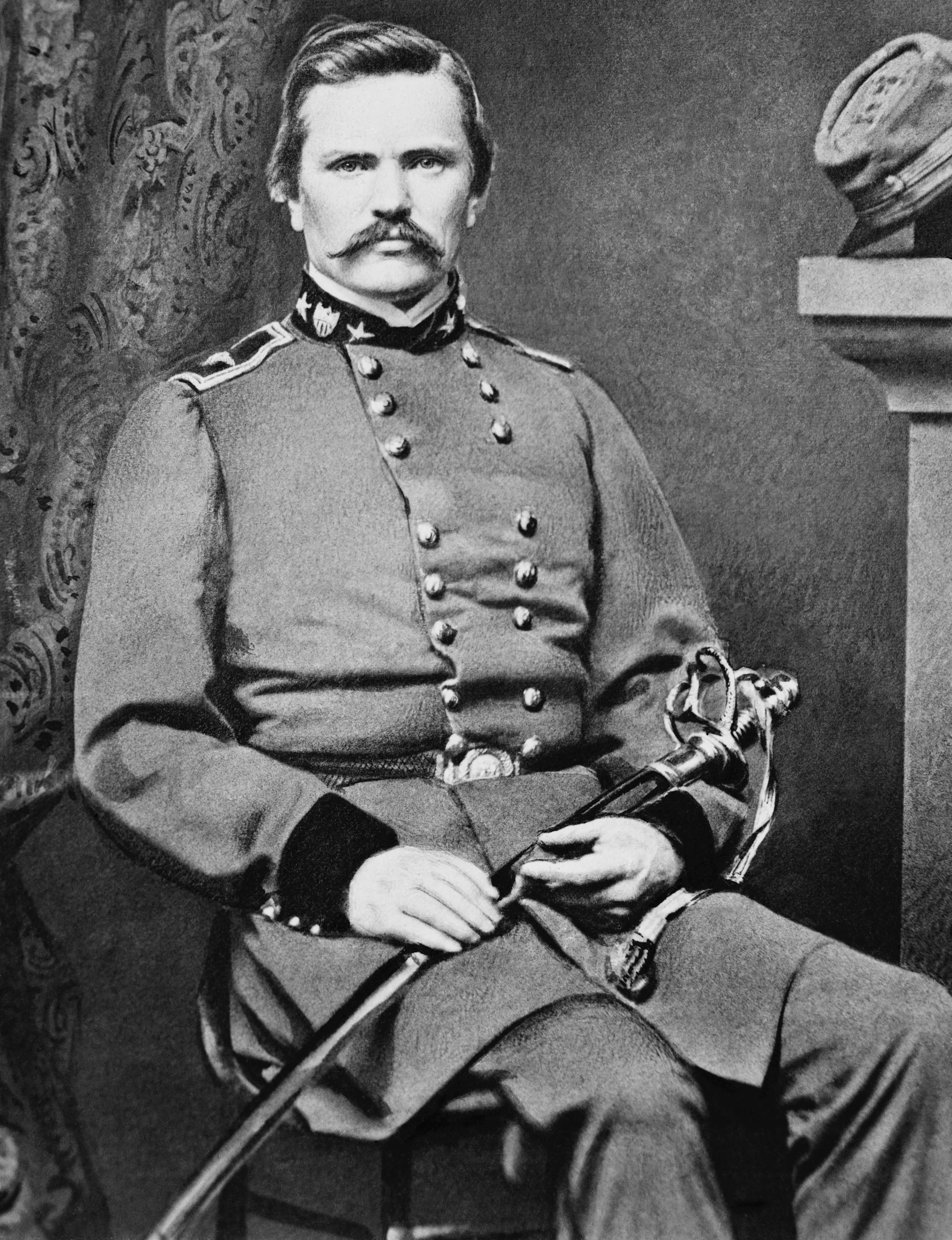
Brig. Gen. S. B. Buckner

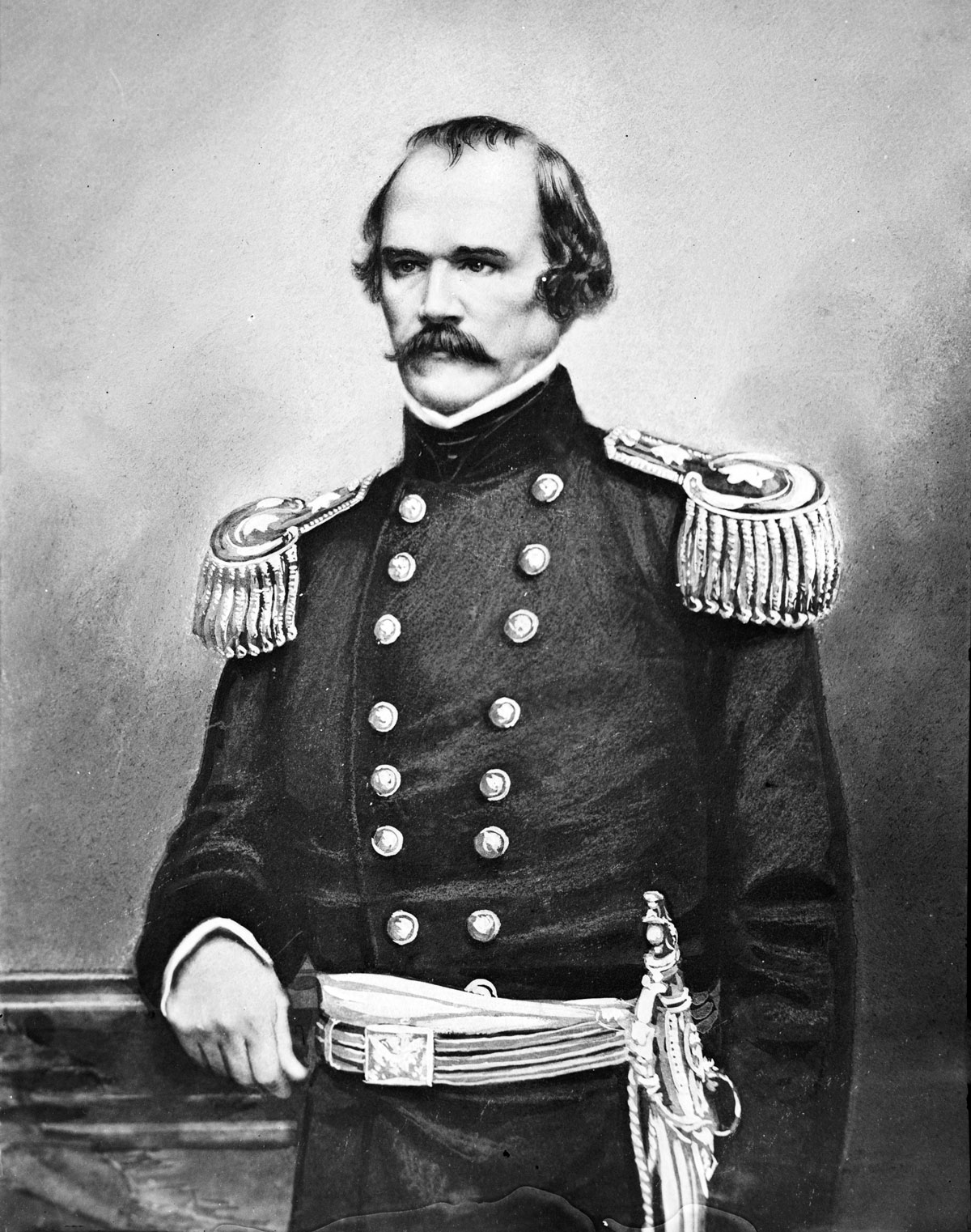
Gen. A. S. Johnston

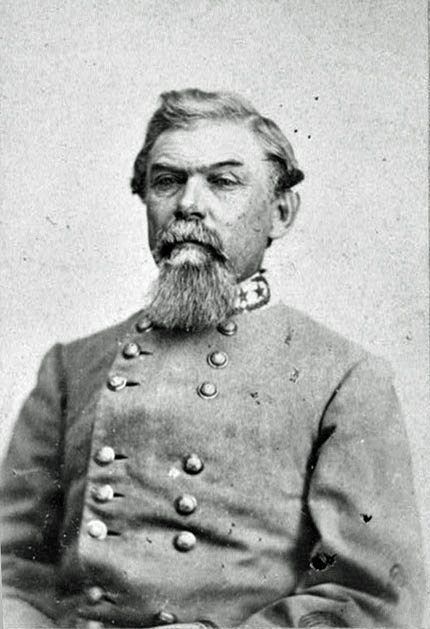
Lt. Gen. W. J. Hardee

== Command under Brigadier General Simon B. Buckner ==
Brig. Gen. Buckner assumed command of all forces in central Kentucky during September 1861 after having first served as a major general and commander of the Kentucky Militia. The forces were organized into two divisions with a reserve force. Later a third division under Brig. Gen. John B. Floyd was added. After Gen. Albert Sidney Johnston took command, Buckner continued to command a division of the Army of Central Kentucky at Bowling Green and Fort Donelson, where he surrendered. After being exchanged in August 1862, Buckner was promoted to major general and commanded a division with these same forces in the Army of Mississippi under the leadership of Gen. Braxton Bragg.

== Command under General Albert S. Johnston ==
Gen. Johnston was in command of the Army of Central Kentucky from October 28, 1861, until March 29, 1862, with the exception of a two-week temporary command by Hardee in December. The area of operation for this army was designated as the part of Tennessee north of the Cumberland River and that part of Kentucky west of where the Cumberland River entered Tennessee to the east. On December 26, 1861, part of the Army of the Kanawha was added. On March 29, 1862, the army at about 23,000 men strong was merged into the Army of Mississippi in preparation for the Battle of Shiloh.

== Command under Major General William J. Hardee ==
Maj. Gen. Hardee took temporary command of the army from December 4 to December 18, 1861.
