= 34th Ohio Infantry Regiment =

- Active: September 1, 1861, to June 24, 1865
- Country: United States
- Allegiance: Union
- Branch: Union Army
- Type: Infantry
- Nickname: Piatt's Zouaves
- Equipment: rifled muskets
- Engagements: Battle of Kanawha Gap; Battle of Princeton Court House; Battle of Fayetteville; Battle of Charleston; Wytheville Raid; Battle of Cloyd's Mountain; Battle of Cove Mountain; Battle of Berryville; Battle of Opequon; Battle of Fisher's Hill; Battle of Cedar Creek

Commanders
- Colonel: Abram S. Piatt
- Colonel: John T. Toland
- Colonel: Freeman E. Franklin

The 34th Ohio Infantry Regiment was an infantry regiment that served in the Union Army during the American Civil War. It primarily served in the Eastern Theater in what is now West Virginia and in Virginia's Shenandoah Valley region. They are well known for wearing early in the war an americanized zouave uniform which consisted of: A dark blue jacket with red trimming, a pair of sky blue baggy trousers with two stripes of red tape going down vertically, a pair of tan gaiters, and a red Ottoman styled fez with a blue tassel. The uniform lasted at least until 1863 based on photographic evidence. During May 1863, the regiment was mounted.

== Organization and service ==
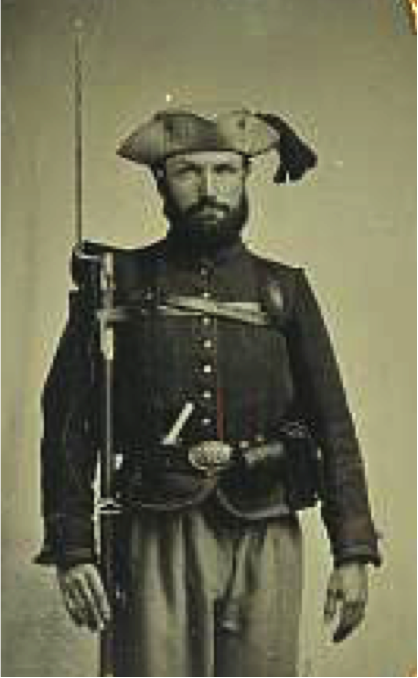
Unidentified soldier from 34th Ohio Infantry

=== Organization ===
The 34th Ohio Infantry Regiment was raised at Camp Lucas near Cincinnati on September 1, 1861 by Abram S. Piatt at his personal expense. Most of the recruits came from the western part of the state. After training and drilling, the new regiment moved to Camp Dennison on September 1, and then entrained for the front lines, arriving on September 20 at Camp Enyart on the Kanawha River in western Virginia.

=== Service ===
The regiment initially served in the forces under George B. McClellan, and then under a variety of generals for the next two years while engaging in several raids and operations in the region. On September 25, 1861, the 34th Ohio won a victory at the Battle of Kanawha Gap near present-day Chapmanville, West Virginia. In September 1862, the regiment fought in the Kanawha Valley Campaign of 1862, doing much of the fighting at the Battle of Fayetteville near the New and Kanawha rivers.

The regiment was mounted during May 1863. Colonel John Toland was killed July 18, 1863, in the Wytheville Raid. When the regiment's term of enlistment expired late in 1863, the men voted to re-enlist on December 23. They were part of Crook's Expedition against the Virginia & Tennessee Railroad in early May 1864. A detachment fought in the Battle of Cloyd's Mountain on May 9, while the main portion of the regiment fought in the Battle of Cove Mountain on May 10. There were more smaller engagements in the region. The regiment was re-mustered as a veteran regiment on January 19, 1864, and participated in many of the battles of the Valley Campaigns of 1864, including the Battle of Opequon near Winchester, Virginia.

The 34th Ohio suffered 10 Officers and 120 enlisted men killed in battle or died from wounds, and 130 enlisted men dead from disease for a total of 260 fatalities. The much depleted regiment was amalgamated with the 36th Ohio Infantry on February 22, 1865.

== See also ==
- List of Ohio Civil War units
