= Battle of Cove Mountain =

Battle in the American Civil War

- Part of American Civil War
- Wythe County in Virginia
Date	May 10, 1864
Location	Wythe County, Virginia (Crockett Cove) 37°00′33″N 81°04′23″W
Result	Inconclusive

Belligerents
United States (Union)	(Confederate States of America) Confederate States

Commanders and leaders
(United States) William W. Averell	(Confederate States of America) John Hunt Morgan

Units involved
1WV Cav Regmt.; 2WV Cav Regmt.; 3WV Cav (det.); 14PA Cav Regmt.; 34OH Mtd Inf Regmt.	8VA Cav Regmt.; 16VA Cav Regmt.; 4KY Cav Regmt.; 10KY Cav Regmt.; 10KY Mtd. Rifles Bttn.; 1KY Cav Bttn.; 2KY Cav Bttn.; 6CSA Cav. Bttn.; 7CSA Cav. Bttn.

Strength
2,019	4,000

Casualties and losses
114	50

The Battle of Cove Mountain occurred in Wythe County, Virginia, on May 10, 1864, during the American Civil War. A Union cavalry division commanded by Brigadier General William W. Averell was prevented from attacking a lead mine located near Wytheville. Confederate forces commanded by Brigadier General John Hunt Morgan, with a detachment of a brigade of cavalry from the command of Brigadier General William E. "Grumble" Jones, stopped Averell at Cove Gap, adjacent to Crockett's Cove and Cove Mountain.

Averell and a larger force commanded by Brigadier General George Crook were part of a Union plan to damage the Confederate-controlled Virginia and Tennessee Railroad. The railroad was used by the Confederacy to transport soldiers and supplies, and served important lead and salt mines. Averell's assignment was to attack the mines, but he was stopped at the cove while attempting to reach the lead mine. After an escape through the mountains during the night, Averell's cavalry was pursued by multiple Confederate forces for five days until his cavalry reunited with Crook's force in Union, West Virginia.

The National Park Service lists the result of this battle as "indecisive". Confederate accounts call the battle a victory for Morgan. Confederate troops prevented Averell from destroying a salt mine, and a lead mine, that were important to the Confederacy for preserving meat and making bullets. However, because of Confederate concern about Averell's intentions, most of the forces commanded by Jones and Morgan could not assist at the Battle of Cloyd's Mountain where Crook's 6,000-man legion had a significant victory. Crook was able to complete his objective to destroy a large railroad bridge across the New River, and important Confederate railroad infrastructure was damaged.

== Background and plan ==
During March 1864, Lieutenant General Ulysses S. Grant became commander of all Union armed forces. Grant's strategy in Virginia was to attack the strongest Confederate Army, Robert E. Lee's Army of Northern Virginia, from multiple fronts. Among targets were the Virginia and Tennessee Railroad and the Virginia Central Railroad, which carried food east from the Shenandoah Valley to help feed Lee's army. Troops also moved between battlefronts on both railroads. The Virginia and Tennessee Railroad helped connect the Confederate capital of Richmond with Tennessee, and was used to move minerals such as salt and lead to Knoxville, Tennessee, and to Virginia factories in Lynchburg, Petersburg, and Richmond. (Note: The Virginia and Tennessee Railroad ran from Lynchburg, Virginia, to Bristol, Tennessee. At Bristol, it connected to the East Tennessee and Virginia Railroad that ran west to Knoxville, Tennessee. At Lynchburg, it connected to the Orange and Alexandria Railroad and the SouthSide Railroad, and both railroads could be used to get to Richmond or Petersburg.)

Brigadier General George Crook was assigned the task of attacking the Virginia and Tennessee Railroad. His force was three brigades of infantry and dismounted cavalry, plus two batteries, that totaled 6,155 men. Four hundred more men were added shortly thereafter. Crook sent a smaller force, commanded by Brigadier General William W. Averell, to attack a salt mine further west from Crook. A Union Army commanded by Major General Franz Sigel in the Shenandoah Valley was ordered to move south to Staunton, Virginia, where it could threaten the Virginia Central Railroad—and all three commands would meet at Staunton.

The Battle of Cove Mountain occurred during Averell's movements to accomplish his portion of Grant's plan. Averell's target salt mine was located in Saltville, Virginia. During 1864, this salt mine produced an estimated two thirds of the salt used by the Confederacy. (Note: Salt, an essential part of the diet for humans and livestock, was also used for preserving meat during the American Civil War.) Saltville is located along the border of Washington and Smyth counties in southeastern Virginia, and is served by a spur line from the Virginia and Tennessee Railroad. Moving east on the main line of the railroad, a lead mine was located on the south side of Wytheville, Virginia, not far from the railroad line. The lead mine was the source for much of the lead used by the Confederacy to produce bullets for its army. Further east from Wytheville, along the rail line, was a regional Confederate Army headquarters at the Dublin Depot near Newbern, Virginia. Near the headquarters was a large Virginia and Tennessee Railroad bridge across the New River, which was one of Crook's targets.

== Opposing forces ==
=== Union ===
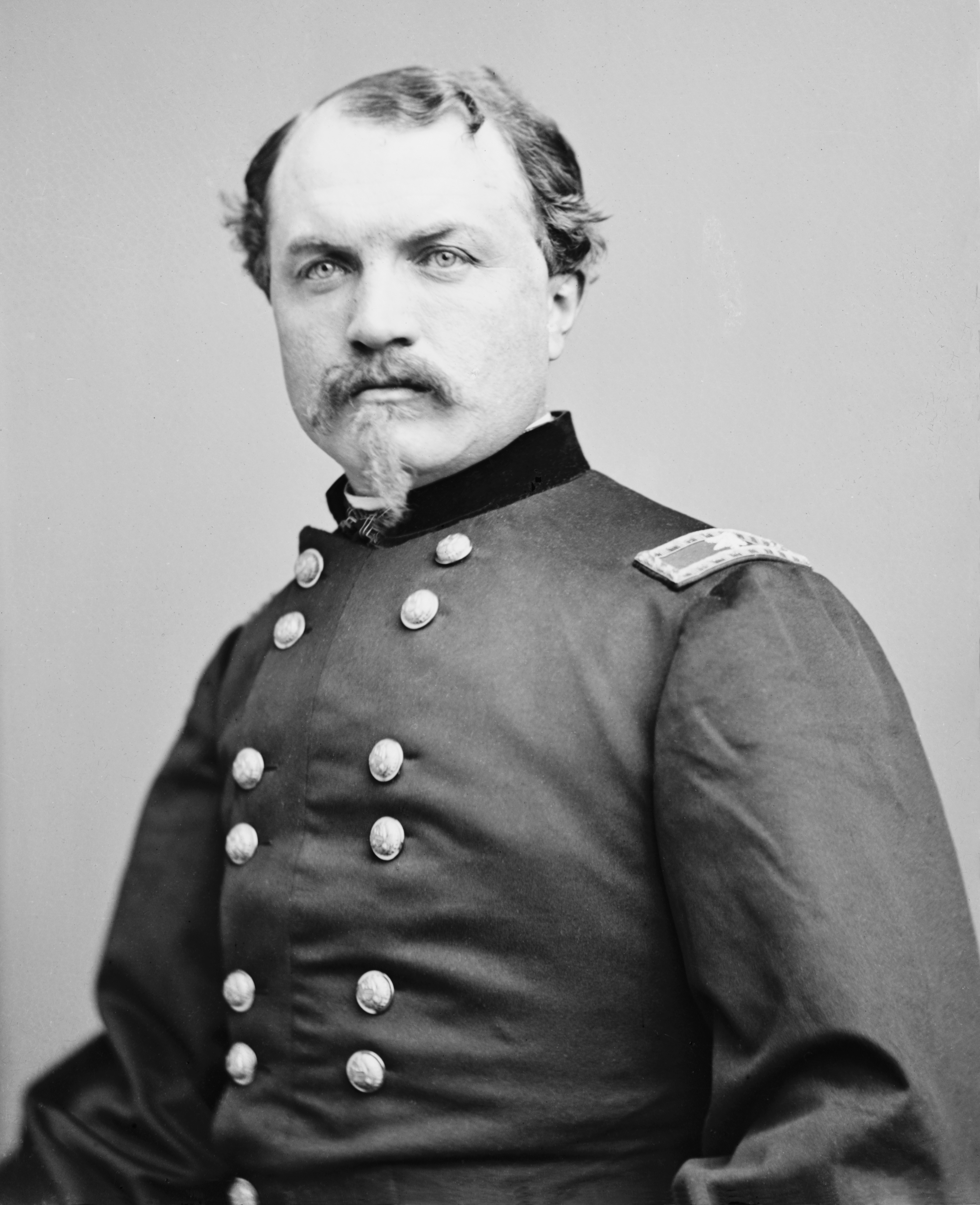
Br. Gen. Averell

Averell departed from a camp near Charleston, West Virginia, in early May with two brigades totaling 2,019 officers and men. His brigade commanders were Brigadier General Alfred N. Duffié and Colonel James M. Schoonmaker. Duffié's brigade consisted of the 2nd West Virginia Cavalry Regiment, the 34th Ohio Mounted Infantry Regiment, and a detachment of the 3rd West Virginia Cavalry Regiment commanded by Major Seymour B. Conger. (Note: Seymour Conger's brother, Everton Conger, left the 3rd West Virginia Cavalry during September 1863 to join the 1st District of Columbia Cavalry Regiment as a major. After the assassination of President Abraham Lincoln, Everton Conger and the 16th New York Cavalry Regiment were involved with the capture of assassin John Wilkes Booth.) Colonel William H. Powell was the commander of the 2nd West Virginia, while Major John W. Shaw commanded the 34th Ohio. Schoonmaker's brigade consisted of the 1st West Virginia Cavalry Regiment, commanded by Colonel Henry Capehart; and the 14th Pennsylvania Cavalry Regiment, commanded by Major John M. Daily. This brigade was armed with carbine versions of seven-shot Spencer repeating rifles. (Note: The 1st West Virginia Cavalry was armed with Spencer repeating rifles (seven shot) during the spring of 1863. The 14th Pennsylvania Cavalry was also armed with seven-shot carbines since December 1863, but the 2nd West Virginia Cavalry did not receive repeating rifles until September 1864.) Other Union cavalry men were typically armed with Colt's navy revolvers, sabers, and single-shot carbines.

=== Confederate ===
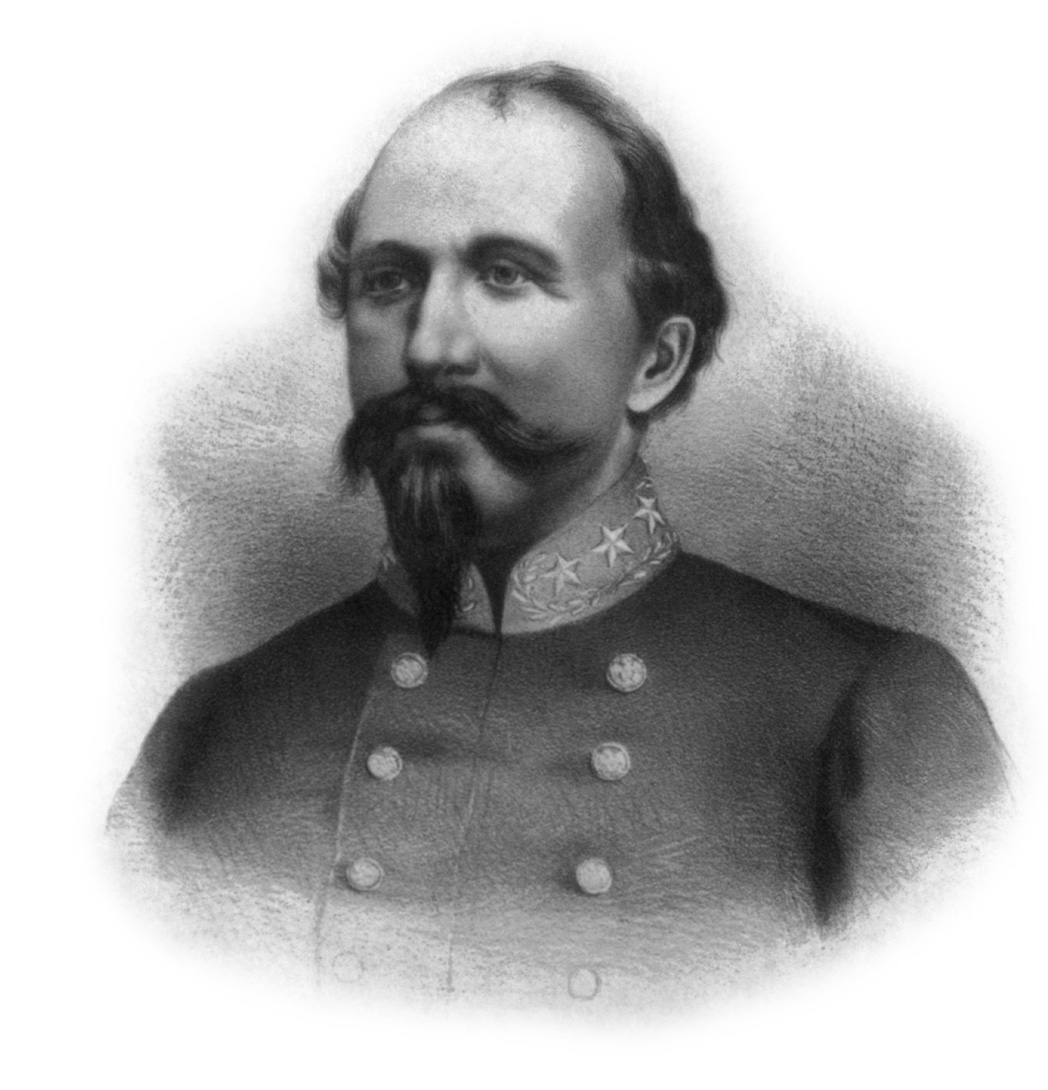
Br. Gen. Morgan

The Confederate Army knew that Union forces were on the move as early as May 2, and moved Brigadier General John Hunt Morgan with two brigades to Saltville from East Tennessee. His First Brigade was commanded by Colonel Henry Giltner, and consisted of the 4th Kentucky Cavalry Regiment, the 10th Kentucky Cavalry Regiment, and the 10th Battalion Kentucky Mounted Rifles. (Note: An additional source is the August 1, 1864 organization of Morgan's command found in the Official Records.) The Second Brigade was commanded by Lieutenant Colonel Robert A. Alston, and consisted of the 1st and 2nd Kentucky Cavalry battalions, and the 6th and 7th Confederate States Cavalry battalions. A few days later, Morgan used the railroad to send his cavalry men who did not have mounts, totaling about 400, east to the Dublin Depot to assist Brigadier General Albert G. Jenkins against Crook. Morgan focused the remaining portion of his command on Averell. Most of Morgan's men were from Kentucky or Tennessee, but Giltner's brigade was familiar with the area because it had spent two years serving there previously.

Confederate troops that were not part of Morgan's command also fought at Cove Mountain, although there is a lack of clarity for all the participants. A detachment known as Jones' Brigade arrived before Morgan. The brigade was commanded by Colonel George B. Crittenden, and included regiments commanded by Colonel A.F. Cook (8th Virginia Cavalry Regiment) and possibly Colonel Henry Bowen (22nd Virginia Cavalry Regiment). The 16th Virginia Cavalry Regiment, commanded by Lieutenant Colonel William L. Graham, also arrived in Wytheville to assist Morgan. Although some sources credit Brigadier General William E. "Grumble" Jones with being at the battle, two major newspaper accounts do not mention him, and a report by Colonel John McCausland mentions Morgan but not Jones. (Note: A New York Times article published in June after the battle mentions Morgan but not Jones. A Richmond Enquirer article published shortly after the battle mentions Morgan, and Crittenden commanding "the forces of Colonel Bowen and Lieutenant Colonel Cook". Historian Robert C. Whisonant, in Arming the Confederacy: How Virginia's Minerals Forged the Rebel War Machine, mentions Morgan but not Jones.)

== Saltville to Wytheville ==
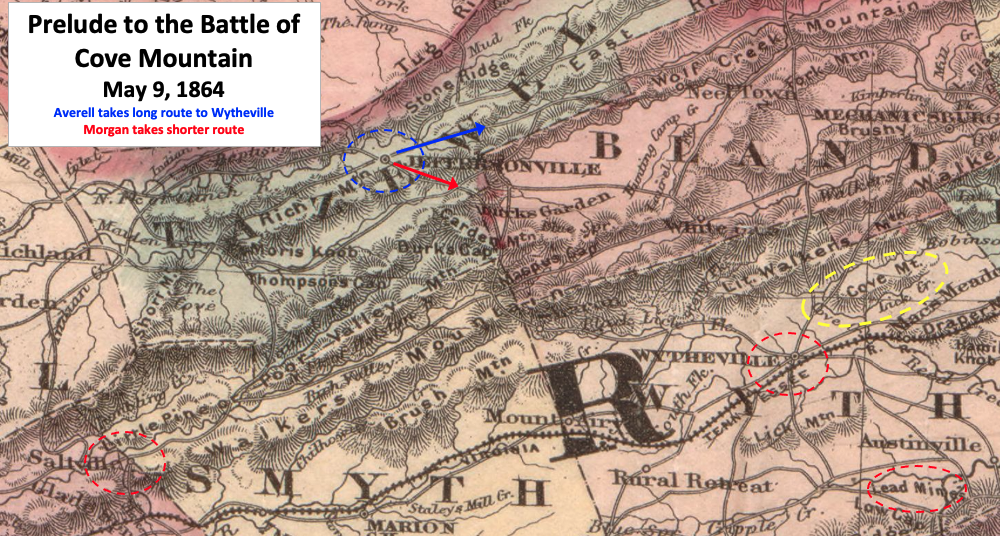
Averell took a route with rough terrain, while Morgan took the shortest route.

Averell's men departed from near the Logan County, West Virginia, courthouse on May 5, 1864. They moved south to Oceana in West Virginia's Wyoming County on May 6, and crossed the state border near Abb's Valley in Virginia's Tazewell County on May 7. Here, they skirmished with enemy scouts and captured one company from the 8th Virginia Cavalry. On the next day, they moved to Jeffersonville (a.k.a. Tazewell Courthouse) in Tazewell County—skirmishing with Confederate troops from Kentucky on the way. (Note: Confederate cavalry companies were composed of as many as 76 men.)

From deserters and prisoners, Averell learned that the Confederate Army was aware of his Saltville objective and the size of his force. He also learned that 4,500 Confederate troops led by John Hunt Morgan and William "Grumble" Jones were waiting for his force (about 2,000 men) at Saltville. Given that information, Averell decided to attack the railroad further east at Wytheville, occupying Morgan and Jones so they could not intercept Crook. As Averell moved east, Morgan began following him.

At the junction of the Jeffersonville, Crab Orchard, and Wytheville roads, Averell continued moving east in the mountains toward Crab Orchard—a rugged road and a longer route to Wytheville. If Morgan had followed Averell, the terrain could have been used to Averell's advantage to hold off Morgan while a detachment attacked Wytheville. However, Morgan was aware of the dangerous terrain, and took the southeast direct route to Wytheville (through Burke's Garden). He arrived at Wytheville ahead of his command, and ordered Confederate troops already there to move north and guard the gap passing through Cove Mountain—the gap necessary for Averell to pass through to get to Wytheville. (Note: Sources disagree on the Confederate force first ordered into the gap. Some sources say it was Colonel Graham and the 16th Virginia Cavalry. Other sources say it was Colonel Crittenden and a portion of Jones' Brigade.) The people of Wytheville were relieved to see Morgan, as they remembered the destruction of the town in 1863 in Colonel John Toland's Wytheville Raid. The town had an old 6-pounder cannon and some powder, but no ammunition. A blacksmith cut up horseshoes and other pieces of iron that could be used as canister.

== Battle ==
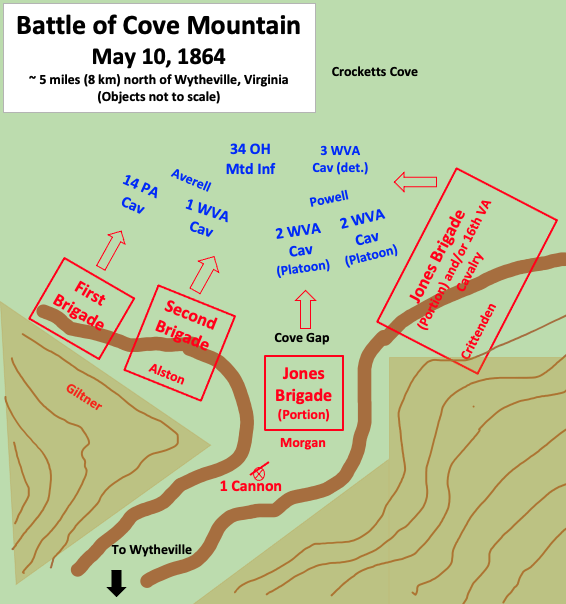
Approximate position of troops (not to scale)

To get to Wytheville and the lead mine further south, Averell needed to pass southward through a small mountain gap near Crockett's Cove. (Note: A soldier from the 2nd West Virginia Cavalry described the battle location as "Cove Gap, of Grassy Lick". The Richmond Enquirer called the location "Crockett's Gap". Author Richard R. Duncan calls the gap "Rocky Gap". Author Whisonant calls the fight "The Battle of the Cove".) When he arrived at the gap, it was already occupied by the Confederate detachment sent north from Wytheville by Morgan—and more of Morgan's men were moving there. Morgan's force was said to be about 4,000, although some historians believe that figure is an exaggeration.

Schoonmaker's 14th Pennsylvania and 1st West Virginia cavalries opened the battle by driving back the advanced guard of the Confederate force that occupied the gap. When the Union cavalry got too close to the gap, dismounted Confederate cavalry on both sides of the gap drove them back. The 2nd West Virginia Cavalry waited nearby with sabers drawn, intending to take the gap in what their Colonel Powell regarded as a suicidal charge. While the regiment was waiting, a member of the regiment's Company H climbed up a tree and observed the Confederate position being reinforced. This was reported to Duffié, and the charge was cancelled. Although not known by Averell at the time, reinforcements (including Morgan's brigades) were positioning on both sides of the gap, and a cannon masked by brush was positioned in the road.

=== Morgan attacks ===
Morgan's command had reached Wytheville around 3:00 pm, and then headed north to the gap. Colonel Giltner's First Brigade and Lieutenant Colonel R.A. Alston's Second Brigade, with Giltner in overall command, were deployed in the woods of the mountain on Morgan's left side of the pass in an effort to circle around to Averell's right flank. Unable to penetrate the gap, and aware of the Confederate reinforcements, Averell's command fell back and formed a line of battle to lure the Confederates out into the cove. A large Confederate force came out of the gap, and more fighting began. Glitner's two brigades attacked Averell's right while dismounted. Morgan commanded Jones' Brigade in person, in front of Averell's left center, and made use of the Wytheville cannon. A third Confederate force attacked Averell's left flank. A soldier from the 1st West Virginia Cavalry, which faced Morgan's First and Second Brigades, said the Confederate battle cry was "We are Morgan's men and will give you hell".

Averell's forehead was grazed by a bullet early in the fighting—a slight wound that bled profusely. He was forced to temporarily relinquish command, and with Duffié nowhere to be found, field command fell to Colonel Powell. Powell divided the 2nd West Virginia Cavalry into platoons, and gradually moved it back with the precision of what Averell called a "dress parade that continued without disorder under heavy fire". (Note: Private Sutton, who participated in the battle, used the term "platoons" to describe the organization of the 2nd West Virginia Cavalry. The map created by the historian for the 13th Kentucky Cavalry makes the 2nd West Virginia Cavalry appear to be organized into two battalions.) Averell later credited the 2nd West Virginia Cavalry with saving the left of the division. Although the 2nd West Virginia was nearly surrounded three or four times during the four hours of fighting, the only break in the Union line was made by the 14th Pennsylvania Cavalry. The 34th Ohio Mounted Infantry quickly filled the gap from its reserve position, and the 14th Pennsylvania reformed and resumed their place in the Union line. Averell's force was pushed back a considerable distance, and fighting ended at dusk.

=== Casualties ===
Averell's report listed losses of 114 officers and men. Estimates of Confederate losses range from 40 to 60 men. One Union soldier, who was at the battle and believed Averell's force was almost surrounded, thought that the Confederates had more casualties than Averell's men because the Confederates did all the charging while the Union soldiers were on defense. A private in the Union cavalry believed that if the fighting had not stopped, half of the Union force would have been captured. Morgan believed that he could have captured Averell's entire force if he had two more hours of daylight.

== Withdrawal and escape ==
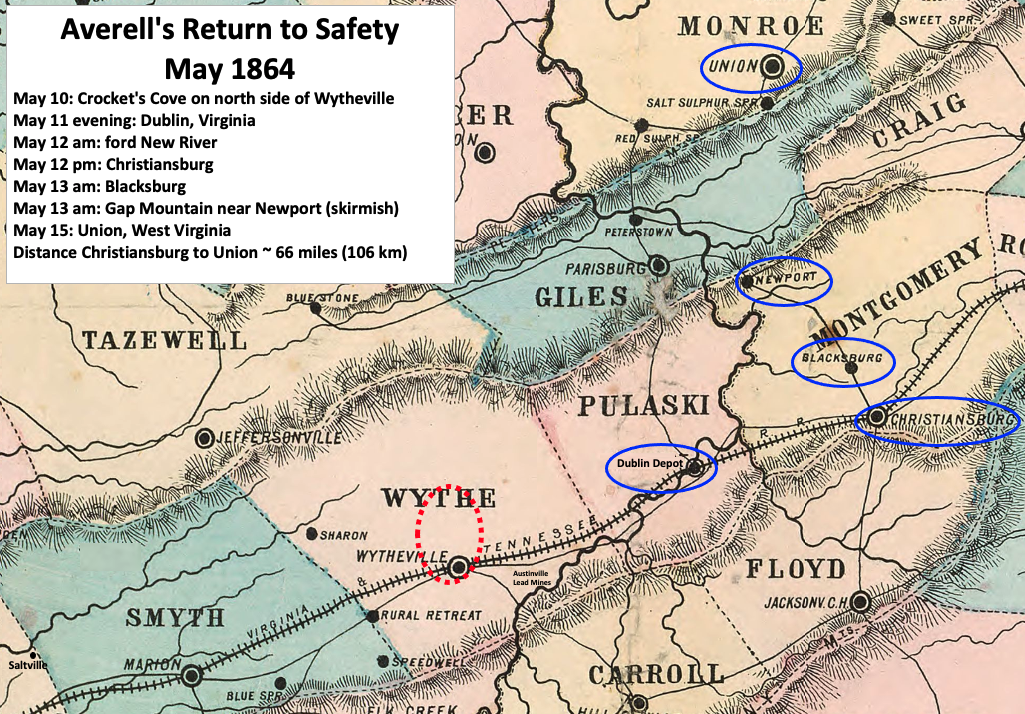
Averell moved to the railroad before heading north while eluding Confederate forces

Averell used an elaborate deception to save his command. First, he told a staff officer that if they could hold Morgan's men until dark, Crook's force would arrive to reinforce them. This was said in front of a local woman from the pro-Confederate community, with hope that the bogus information would get back to the Confederate leadership. Second, he had an officer notify him that Crook arrived. Third, he ordered his men to give three cheers for General Crook. It is unknown if the deception or darkness caused the fighting to stop, but Morgan's men returned to the gap. Averell had his men build one fire for every two men—about one thousand fires—to make it appear that Crook had arrived.

Under the cover of darkness, Averell's force withdrew. The severely wounded were left behind at the Crockett's Cove Presbyterian Church. Averell's men had to ascend and descend a mountain that did not have a good road, so they led their horses while on foot. By dawn, the command was at the bottom of the mountain with 30 miles (48 km) of difficult terrain between them and the cove. Here, they rested for half a day before continuing to the Dublin Rail Depot.

On the evening of May 11, the Union horsemen reached the depot, and spent the night there in soaking rain. They discovered that Crook had already destroyed the large railroad bridge over the New River, and the river itself was rising rapidly because of recent rains. The river grew to about one-third of a mile (0.54 km) wide and rising, with a rapid current and rocky riverbed. Averell's men forded the New River about three miles (4.8 km) west of Christiansburg, and several men and horses drowned. After the command arrived at Christiansburg, the 2nd West Virginia Cavalry was sent back to guard the ford, and witnessed Confederate forces unable to cross the still–rising river. At Christiansburg, the command found a small Confederate force that they drove away with drawn sabers. They also captured two 3-inch caliber artillery pieces.

=== Return home ===
From Christiansburg, Averell was able to communicate with Crook, and was ordered to destroy rail line eastward. The rail depot and four miles (6.4 km) of line were destroyed, and then a trip back to the safety of West Virginia was started. Some of the ammunition was rendered useless from the river and rain, and Averell's after-action report mentioned that his "ammunition was nearly exhausted" as the reason for his departure. Omitted from his report was that by a ruse on a telegraph, he had learned that Confederate troops were coming from the east by rail—and he thought it was in his best interest to join Crook's column that was already in Blacksburg, Virginia, and then continue north to the safety of Union military bases in West Virginia. Averell was pursued by three Confederate forces commanded by Brigadier General John D. Imboden, Colonel William E. "Mudwall" Jackson, and Colonel William H. French.

The Confederate forces were unable to catch Averell at Blacksburg (and Crook had already left), so the pursuit was continued further north. On the morning of May 13, Jackson tried to intercept Averell at Salt Pond Mountain and Gap Mountain. Rain made the terrain slippery, and mountain streams became dangerous. Imboden's report said that at Gap Mountain, Jackson "intercepted Averell's command, and scattered it in the mountains. Owing to the darkness and the swollen streams no further pursuit was made with the infantry...." A soldier from the 2nd West Virginia Cavalry wrote that they were fired upon by Confederate artillery near Gap Mountain, so two companies of skirmishers occupied the enemy while the column crossed the mountain while dismounted. Their path was narrow and dangerous, and the mountain was steep. The men used one hand to lead their horses by the bit, and their other hand held the tail of the horse in front of them. The command continued north using "narrow and unfrequented paths and roads". On May 15, Averell met Crook near Union, West Virginia.

== Aftermath ==
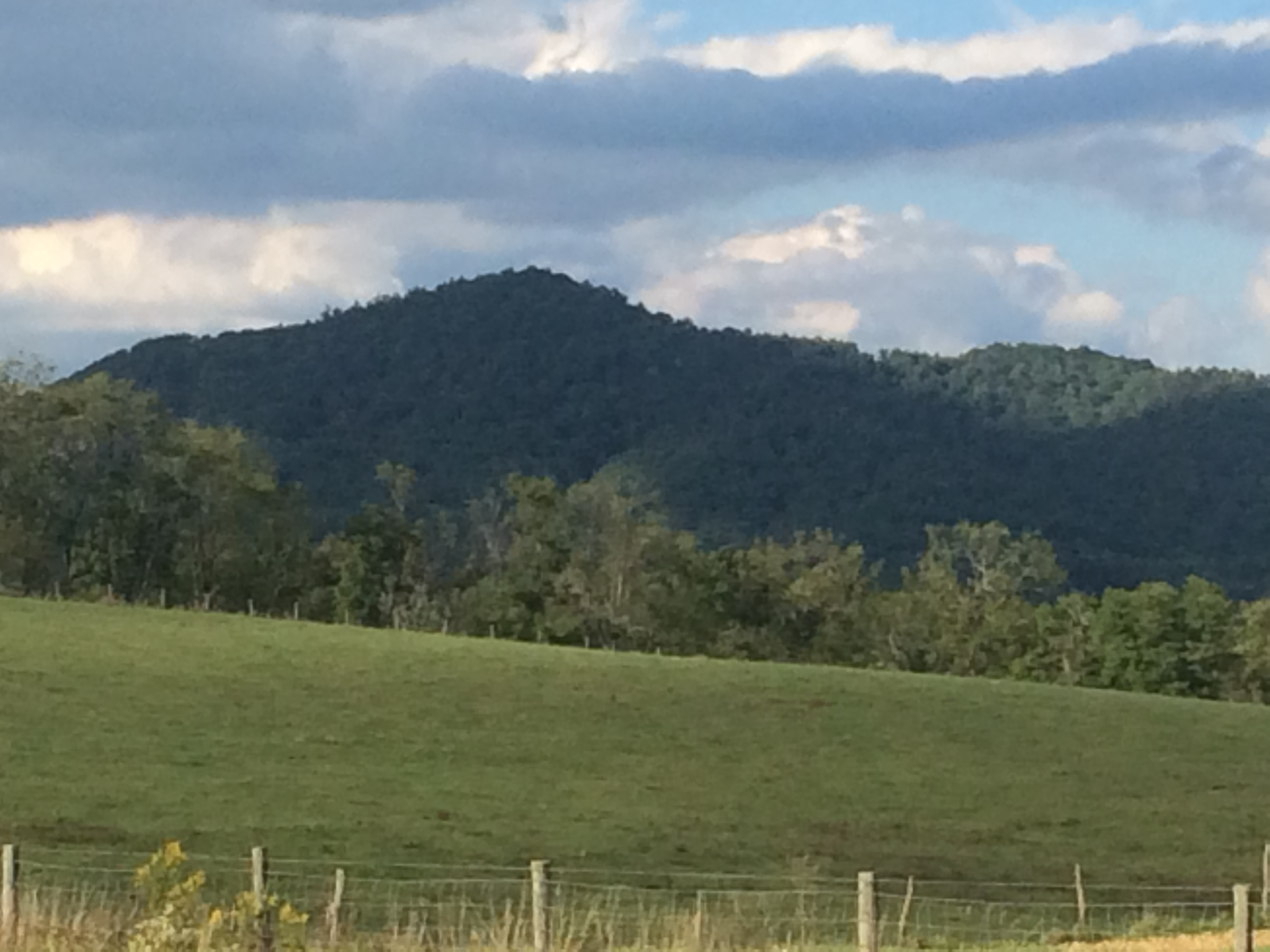
Mountains north of Wytheville (pictured in 2016)

The Battle of Cove Mountain is declared "indecisive" by the National Park Service. Averell praised his command, saying it "attacked and held a superior force of the enemy near Wytheville on the 10th instant, thereby enabling another column to accomplish its purpose without the opposition of overwhelming numbers". The New York Times wrote that the "cavalry raid of that dashing and gallant officer, Gen. Averill [sic]...was undoubtedly one of the most hazardous and brilliant of the war. It was, too, successful." This contrasts with a Confederate newspaper in Richmond, which called the battle "a very important victory" for the Confederacy. A report by Colonel McCausland said that "Averell had been defeated by Morgan near Wytheville". Another source says "Morgan caught Averell at Crockett's Cove near Wytheville and drubbed him severely".

Numerous changes happened to the leaders of the battle during the remaining portion of the year. Before and after the battle, Duffié and Averell did not get along. Duffié moved to another division as the replacement for General Julius Stahel, who was wounded on June 5 at the Battle of Piedmont. Duffié was captured in October, and Major General Philip Sheridan requested his dismissal from the service. (Note: Sheridan believed that Duffié's stupidity caused his capture. Duffié, who falsified much of his background, was a prisoner of war until 1865. In 1869 he was appointed U.S. consul to Spain.) Powell became a brigade commander and on September 23 replaced Averell as division commander. Long after the war, he was awarded the Medal of Honor for actions in the Sinking Creek Raid that occurred in 1862. Schoonmaker was also awarded the Medal of Honor after the war. His medal was for actions on September 19, 1864, in the Third Battle of Winchester. On the Confederate side, Jones was killed in Virginia on June 5 in the Battle of Piedmont. Graham was captured at the Battle of Moorefield in August. Morgan was killed in a surprise attack in eastern Tennessee on September 4.

Grant's plan to put pressure on Lee's Army of Northern Virginia was only partially successful at first. Crook had a major victory at the Battle of Cloyd's Mountain, and completed an objective of destroying the large New River bridge used by the Virginia and Tennessee Railroad. However, Averell was unable to damage the salt mines or lead mines, and Sigel was defeated on May 15 at the Battle of New Market. Crook, Averell, and Sigel did not meet at Staunton. Although there are various interpretations of the outcome of the Battle of Cove Mountain, one cannot dispute that the Wythe County lead mines in Austinville continued to supply ammunition for the Confederate Army. Later in the year, Union Major General Philip Sheridan led a string of military victories in the Shenandoah Valley, and destroyed much of the agricultural infrastructure used to feed Lee's army. Crook, Averell, Powell, and Schoonmaker had leadership roles in Sheridan's Army of the Shenandoah. During December 1864, Major General George Stoneman conducted a raid eastward from Tennessee that severely damaged the Virginia and Tennessee Railroad infrastructure in western Virginia. The Wythe County lead mines were damaged on December 17, and the Saltville saltworks severely damaged after the Second Battle of Saltville on December 20.

=== Preservation ===
As of 2001, the Cove Mountain battlefield at Crockett's Cove still had much of its integrity. It had two historic houses, a cemetery, and the Crockett's Cove Presbyterian Church. The church was listed in the National Register of Historic Places on October 10, 1992, and 17 Union soldiers died there. A Virginia historical marker is located near the mountain gap, and another marker is located at the other end of the cove at the church. The John Crockett House and Cemetery are located near the center of the cove. The Allen Taylor Crockett house (built in 1848) was used as a Confederate hospital during the battle and still stands overlooking the battle area at the intersection of Cove Road and Crockett's Cove Road.
