= Henry Waterman Warren =

American politician (1838–1919)

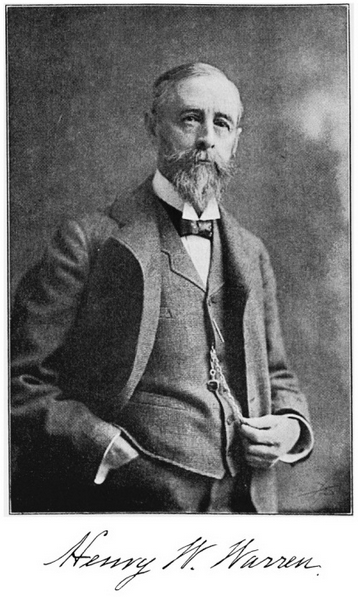
- A portrait of Warren included in his book

32nd Speaker of the Mississippi House of Representatives

Member of the Mississippi House of Representatives
- In office 1871
- Preceded by: F. E. Franklin
- Succeeded by: John R. Lynch

Member of the Mississippi House of Representatives from the Leake County district
- In office 1870–1871

Personal details
- Born: March 18, 1838 Auburn, Massachusetts, U.S.
- Died: February 21, 1919 (aged 80) Holden, Massachusetts, U.S.
- Party: Republican

Henry Waterman Warren (March 18, 1838 – February 21, 1919) was an American teacher, plantation owner, tanner, judge, and politician. He served in the Mississippi House of Representatives and Massachusetts House of Representatives. He wrote an account of his time in Mississippi as a "carpetbagger".

== Early life ==
Warren's ancestry traces back to John Warren of Nayland, England, who settled the Massachusetts Bay Colony alongside John Winthrop. Warren was born in Auburn, Massachusetts, to parents Waterman Goulding and Mary Eddy Warren on March 18, 1838. His family moved to Holden, Massachusetts, in 1840.

Warren attended Worcester Academy and Westfield Normal School, among other institutions, then graduated from Yale in 1865.

== Career ==
Warren held a teaching position at a school in Nashville, Tennessee, for six months following graduation from Yale, then moved to Leake County, Mississippi, with his brother in 1866. He remained in Mississippi for a decade as a cotton plantation owner.

Warren accepted an appointment as Leake County probate judge from Adelbert Ames in 1867, served on the state's constitutional convention as a representative of Leake County, and was elected to the Mississippi House of Representatives in 1870 and 1871. During the 1871 session, Warren was Speaker of the Mississippi House of Representatives. He then served as chief clerk of the Mississippi Legislature until 1875. From 1873, Warren served concurrently as Mississippi levee commissioner, via a gubernatorial appointment from Ridgley C. Powers. Warren attended the Republican National Convention as a delegate twice, in 1868 and 1876.

Warren returned to Holden, Massachusetts, in 1876 and became a tanner alongside another brother. He was elected to the Massachusetts House of Representatives in 1882 and 1885. Warren served several terms, totaling seven years, some consecutive, on the town's board of selectman, throughout the 1870s, 1880s, and 1890s. He was first elected city treasurer in 1889, and held the office through 1898. From 1905 to 1908, Warren was president of the Worcester & Holden Street Railway.

Warren presented Yale University with copy of his book of reminisces. It is in the collection and available online.

Warren married Dora L. Howe in 1877. Through 1894, the couple had four children. He fell ill and died of heart failure at home in Holden on February 21, 1919.

== Books ==
- Reminiscences of a Mississippi Carpet-bagger The Davis Press, Holden, Massachusetts (1914)
