= Freeman E. Franklin =

Mississippi politician

31st Speaker of the Mississippi House of Representatives

Member of the Mississippi House of Representatives
- In office 1870 – September 28, 1870
- Preceded by: Samuel J. Gholson
- Succeeded by: Henry Waterman Warren

Member of the Mississippi House of Representatives from the Yazoo County district
- In office 1870 – September 28, 1870

Personal details
- Born: 1823 or 1824
- Died: September 28, 1870 (aged 46–47) Hinds County, Mississippi

Freeman E. Franklin (1823/1824 - September 28, 1870) was a state legislator in Mississippi. He served as Speaker of the Mississippi House of Representatives in 1870.

Franklin was from New York. He served in the Union Army in the 34th Ohio Infantry Regiment during the American Civil War rising to the rank of colonel. He fought in battles such as the Kanawha Valley Campaign of 1862, the Wytheville Raid (where he assumed command of a two-regiment force), and the Third Battle of Winchester. In 1863, he commanded a brigade in Scammon's Division of the Department of West Virginia.

After the Civil War, Franklin moved to Yazoo City, Mississippi. He was then elected to represent Yazoo County in the Mississippi House of Representatives in the 1870 session. In that session, he was elected to be the House's Speaker. While still in office, he died on September 28, 1870, near Jackson, Mississippi. In December 1870, Republicans held a nominating committee meeting in Yazoo City to designate a replacement for him after his death before his term expired. He was succeeded as Speaker by H. W. Warren.

== See also ==
- Speaker of the Mississippi House of Representatives
- Reconstruction era
