= Louis von Blessing =

Union brevet brigadier general

- Louis von Blessingh
- Born: April 8, 1829; Philippshagen, Rügen, Prussia
- Died: July 15, 1887 (aged 58); Toledo, Ohio, US
- Burial place: Woodlawn Cemetery, Toledo
- Military career
- Allegiance: Prussia; United States of America: Union
- Branch: Prussian Army; Union Army
- Service years: 1861–1865
- Rank: Lieutenant Colonel; Brevet Brigadier General
- Unit: 14th Ohio Infantry Regiment
- Commands: 37th Ohio Infantry Regiment
- Conflicts: American Civil War

Louis von Blessing (born Louis von Blessingh; April 8, 1829 – July 15, 1887) was a Prussian-born Union Army officer during the period of the American Civil War. Serving in the Army of the Tennessee, he participated in numerous battles of the Western theater.

== Biography ==
Von Blessing was born on April 8, 1829, at Philippshagen on the island of Rügen, part of the Kingdom of Prussia. He received a military education and became an officer in the Prussian Army, serving until he was discharged in 1858. Von Blessing emigrated to America and settled in Toledo, Ohio, where he worked as a clerk at a dry good store.

When the American Civil War broke out von Blessing became a captain in the 14th Ohio Infantry Regiment, a three-months unit. Afterwards he helped organizing four companies of the 37th Ohio Infantry Regiment, eventually commanding Company B. He was promoted to Lieutenant Colonel in September 1861 and participated in many important battles fought by the Army of the Tennessee. He was severely wounded during the Vicksburg campaign on May 22, 1863. After a lengthy recovery he returned in time to join Sherman's March to the Sea. He mustered out with his unit at Little Rock, Arkansas on August 7, 1865.

In 1866 he was brevetted to Brigadier General, backdated to March 13, 1865, for meritourious services and gallant conduct in the field. After the war von Blessing worked in the real estate business and as a travel agent for a wine company. He died on July 15, 1887, at Toledo, Ohio, of congestion of the brain. He was buried there in Woodlawn Cemetery.

== See also ==
- List of American Civil War brevet generals
