= 1st Kentucky Infantry Regiment (Union) =

- Active: April 1861 - June 18, 1864
- Country: United States
- Allegiance: Union
- Branch: Infantry
- Engagements: Battle of Kanawha Gap; Battle of Shiloh; Siege of Corinth; Battle of Perryville; Battle of Stones River; Tullahoma Campaign; Battle of Chickamauga; Chattanooga campaign

The 1st Kentucky Infantry Regiment was an infantry regiment that served in the Union Army during the American Civil War.

== Service ==
The 1st Kentucky Infantry Regiment was organized at Pendleton in Cincinnati, Ohio, March - April 1861 as a three-month regiment. Because the regiment was organized while Kentucky tried to remain neutral, it was not recognized until June 4, 1861, when it was reorganized and mustered in for a three-year enlistment under the command of Colonel James V. Guthrie. Although credited to Kentucky, the regiment was almost entirely composed by Ohio volunteers.

The regiment was ordered to the Kanawha Valley, Virginia, July 10, 1861, and attached to Kanawha Brigade, Western Virginia, to October 1861. District of the Kanawha, Western Virginia, to January 1862. 22nd Brigade, Army of the Ohio, to February 1862. 22nd Brigade, 4th Division, Army of the Ohio, to September 1862. 22nd Brigade, 4th Division, II Corps, Army of the Ohio, to November 1862. 1st Brigade, 2nd Division, Left Wing, XIV Corps, Army of the Cumberland, to January 1863. 1st Brigade, 2nd Division, XXI Corps, Army of the Cumberland, to October 1863. 1st Brigade, 1st Division, IV Corps, to June 1864.

The 1st Kentucky Infantry mustered out of service on June 18, 1864, at Covington, Kentucky.

== Detailed service ==
Campaign in western Virginia July to October 1861. March to Sissonville in rear of Wise, returning via Ravenswood and Charleston July 14–26. Moved to Gauley, arriving August 1. Moved to Camp Piatt, arriving August 25. Gauley Bridge August 28. Boone Court House September 1. Peytonia September 12. Moved to Raleigh September 20–27. Chapmansville September 25. Return to Gauley, arriving October 10. Operations in the Kanawha Valley October 19-November 16. Skirmish at Gauley Bridge October 28. Attack on Gauley by Floyd's Batteries November 1–9. Pursuit of Floyd November 10. Duty at Charleston December 4 to January 5, 1862. Ordered to Kentucky January 5, 1862. Camp near Bardstown January 24-February 13. March to Nashville, Tennessee, February 14-March 12, and to Savannah, Tennessee, March 13-April 5. Battle of Shiloh, April 6–7. Advance on and siege of Corinth, Mississippi, April 29-May 30. Phillips Creek, Widow Serratt's, May 21. Bridge Creek, before Corinth, May 28. Occupation of Corinth May 30. Pursuit to Booneville May 31-June 6. Buell's Campaign in northern Alabama and middle Tennessee June to August. March to Louisville, Kentucky, in pursuit of Bragg, August 21-September 25. Pursuit of Bragg to London, Kentucky, October 1–22. Battle of Perryville, October 8. Camp Wild Cat October 17. Nelson's Cross Roads October 18. Destruction of Salt Works at Goose Creek October 23–24. March to Nashville, Tennessee, October 24-November 9, and duty there until December 26. Advance on Murfreesboro December 26–30. Lavergne December 26–27. Battle of Stones River December 30–31, 1862 and January 1–3, 1863. Duty at Cripple Creek until June. Expedition to Woodbury April 2. Snow Hill, Woodbury, April 3. Tullahoma Campaign June 24-July 7. At Manchester July 9 to August 16. Passage of Cumberland Mountains and Tennessee River, and Chickamauga Campaign August 16-September 22. Pea Vine Creek September 10. Lee and Gordon's Mills September 11–13. Battle of Chickamauga, September 19–20. Siege of Chattanooga, September 24-October 27. Reopening Tennessee River October 26–29. Duty at Bridgeport, Alabama, until January 26, 1864. At Ooltewah, Georgia, until May 17, and at Resaca until May 29. Ordered to Kentucky May 29. Operations against Morgan's invasion of Kentucky May 31-June 18. Mt. Sterling June 9.

== Casualties ==
The regiment lost a total of 143 men during service; 60 enlisted men killed or mortally wounded, 1 officer and 82 enlisted men died of disease.

== Commanders ==
- Colonel James V. Guthrie - resigned December 21, 1861
- Colonel David A. Enyart
- Lieutenant Colonel Alva R. Hadlock

== Notable members ==
- Musician William H. Horsfall, Company G - Medal of Honor recipient for action during the Siege of Corinth, May 21, 1862

== See also ==
- List of Kentucky Civil War Units
- Kentucky in the Civil War
