= Kanawha Division =

Union Army division

- Active: 1862-1864
- Country: United States of America
- Branch: United States Army
- Size: Division
- Engagements: American Civil War

Commanders
- Notable commanders: Jacob D. Cox; Eliakim P. Scammon; George Crook; Isaac H. Duval; Rutherford B. Hayes

The Kanawha Division was a Union Army division which could trace its origins back to a brigade originally commanded by Jacob D. Cox. This division served in western Virginia and Maryland and was at times led by such famous personalities as George Crook and Rutherford B. Hayes.

== History ==
=== Kanawha Brigade ===
On July 1, 1861 Brig. Gen. Jacob D. Cox took command of a brigade, composed of Ohio volunteer regiments. He titled his command "Kanawha Brigade" in reference to its duty in the Kanawha Valley in West Virginia. A portion of the brigade from the 34th Ohio Infantry fought at the Battle of Kanawha Gap in September 1861. The brigade became part of the new District of the Kanawha, both of which were commanded by Cox. Cox and the brigade took part in the Battle of Princeton Court House in 1862.

=== Second Bull Run ===
By 1862 the unit grew to the size of a division. As early as June 1862 the name "Kanawha Division" was officially being used for service in the Mountain Department. In preparation for the upcoming battle of Second Bull Run, Cox and the Kanawha Division were transferred to the Army of Virginia. Only one brigade under Col. Eliakim P. Scammon was involved in the engagement and that was only in the preliminary fighting near Bull Run Bridge on August 27. In the aftermath of Bull Run the Kanawha Division was transferred to the Washington Defenses which Cox also assumed command of upon his arrival in Washington.

=== Maryland Campaign ===
During the Maryland Campaign the Kanawha Division was removed from Washington and attached to the IX Corps. The division was composed of two brigades commanded by colonels Eliakim P. Scammon and Augustus Moor. Cox remained in command and led the division at the Battle of South Mountain. Days before the Battle of Antietam an unusual change in command occurred. General Ambrose E. Burnside had recently commanded the IX Corps, but during the Maryland Campaign had been raised to that of a "Wing" commander, having under his command the IX Corps and I Corps. General Jesse L. Reno had been acting IX Corps commander, but upon his death at South Mountain, Jacob Cox being the next ranking general in the corps replaced Reno in command. Colonel Scammon, though only a colonel, was the next ranking officer and took command of the Kanawha Division. At Antietam, Burnside still held on to his title of Wing commander, even though the two corps in his wing were on complete opposite sides of the battlefield. Burnside remained with his old IX Corps but elected to keep Cox in corps command, creating an extra and unnecessary link in the chain of command. The Kanawha Division's two brigades were now commanded by Col. Hugh Ewing (succeeding Scammon) and Col. George Crook (replacing Moor, who had been captured Sept 13). Crook's brigade crossed Burnside Bridge in support of Samuel D. Sturgis's division while Ewing's brigade crossed Antietam Creek at Snavely's Ford in support of Isaac P. Rodman.

=== West Virginia and Morgan's Raid ===
After Antietam, Cox was transferred to duty in the Department of the Ohio and the Kanawha Division returned to West Virginia. George Crook replaced Scammon in command of the division during the winter of 1862/1863 until he was also transferred further west, at which time Scammon returned to command. By the time Scammon returned to command the division lost its official designation as the "Kanawha Division" and was now designated the 3rd Division in the Department of West Virginia. This period also marked a time of relative inactivity for the division. Fighting devolved to guerrilla operations against Confederate partisans, particularly those under John S. Mosby. One noteworthy unit to come out of the division at this time was the so-called Blazer's Scouts created by Colonel Carr B. White. One of the division's brigade commanders, Colonel Rutherford B. Hayes, scorned Scammon for his cautious nature and the resulting inactivity. When George Crook returned to command the division in 1864, Hayes welcomed the aggressive new commander.

=== Cloyd's Mountain ===
Crook took command of the Kanawha Division in February 1864. At the time only a few regiments remained from the original Kanawha Division which had fought at South Mountain and the division was officially designated the 2nd Division in the Department of West Virginia. The division had three brigades commanded respectively by colonels Rutherford Hayes, Carr B. White and Horatio G. Sickel. West Virginia Union regiments were dispersed throughout the three brigades, the original Ohio regiments were divided between Hayes and White and two Pennsylvania regiments were added with the arrival of Colonel Sickel. Crook led the division into action at the Battle of Cloyd's Mountain and then joined David Hunter's army for the Battle of Lynchburg.

=== Army of the Kanawha and Army of West Virginia ===
On July 2, 1864 George Crook took command of what he called the Army of the Kanawha. At the same time Crook also personally commanded the 1st and 2nd "Kanawha" Divisions of his army. By the end of July Joseph Thoburn assumed command of the 1st Division and Isaac H. Duval of the 2nd Division. A third division of infantry and two divisions of cavalry were also added. Crook led his short-lived army into the Second Battle of Kernstown. On August 8, Crook renamed his forces the Army of West Virginia. Crook's "army" joined Philip H. Sheridan's forces outside Winchester, Virginia under the banner of the VIII Corps. Colonel Duval continued in command of the Kanawha Division at the battle of Opequon and was initially held in reserve. At a critical point in the fighting the division was called forward and the brigade of Colonel Hayes made a charge against the Confederate flank. During the fighting Colonel Duval was wounded and Hayes assumed command of the Kanawha Division. At Opequon the division had two brigades initially commanded by colonels Hayes and Daniel Johnson. Colonel Hiram Devol succeeded Hayes in command of the 1st Brigade command and Lt. Col. Benjamin F. Coates replaced the wounded Johnson in command of the 2nd Brigade during the fighting.

Despite the inquiries of several brigadier generals for command of the Kanawha Division, Crook decided to keep Hayes in command, much to the Ohio politician's delight. Hayes and Crook helped coordinate the successful flank attack at the battle of Fisher's Hill carried out by Hayes' division. At the battle of Cedar Creek the entire Union army was caught off guard by the Confederate surprise attack and Crook's entire command bore the weight of the initial assault. Hayes was wounded and narrowly escaped capture. Despite this poor showing of Hayes and the Kanawha Division, earlier successes in the campaign assured their reputations would escape any permanent blemish. Hayes remained in command of the Kanawha Division until December 1864. Cedar Creek would be its last major fight of the war.

== Command History ==
Commander	Date	Official Designation	Major Battles
BG Jacob D. Cox	1–25 July 1861	Kanawha Brigade, Dept of Ohio	
BG Jacob D. Cox	25 July-11 Oct 1861	Kanawha Brigade, Army of Occupation	Battle of Kanawha Gap
BG Jacob D. Cox	11 Oct 1861-26 June 1862	Kanawha Brigade, Dist. of Kanawha	Battle of Princeton Court House
BG Jacob D. Cox	26 June-30 Aug 1862	Kanawha Division, Army of Virginia	Second Battle of Bull Run
BG Jacob D. Cox	30 Aug-7 Sept 1862	Kanawha Division, Defenses of Washington	
BG Jacob D. Cox	7-14 Sept 1862	Kanawha Division, IX Corps	Battle of South Mountain
Col Eliakim Scammon	14 Sept-Oct 1862	Kanawha Division, IX Corps	Battle of Antietam
BG George Crook	Oct 1862-21 Jan 1863	Kanawha Division, Dept of the Ohio	
	21 Jan-27 Mar 1863	Kanawha Division, Dept of the Ohio	
BG Eliakim Scammon	27 Mar 1863-3 Feb 1864	3rd Division, Dept of West Virginia	Morgan's Raid
BG George Crook	3 Feb-28 Apr 1864	3rd Division, Dept of West Virginia	
BG George Crook	28 Apr-2 July 1864	2nd Division, Dept of West Virginia	Battle of Cloyd's Mountain
BG George Crook	2–22 July 1864	2nd Division, Army of the Kanawha	
Col Isaac H. Duval	22 July-8 Aug 1864	2nd Division, Army of the Kanawha	Second Battle of Kernstown
Col Isaac H. Duval	8 Aug-19 Sept 1864	2nd Division, Army of West Virginia	Battle of Opequon
Col Rutherford Hayes	19 Sept-24 Dec 1864	2nd Division, Army of West Virginia	Battle of Fisher's Hill, Battle of Cedar Creek
Col Isaac H. Duval	24 Dec 1864-Jan 1865	2nd Division, Army of West Virginia	
BG Joseph A. J. Lightburn	Jan 1865-22 May 1865	2nd Division, Army of West Virginia	
BG William P. Carlin	22 May–July 1865	2nd Division, Army of West Virginia	units mustered out

== Units ==
These regiments fought in the Kanawha Division from South Mountain to Cedar Creek

- 12th Ohio Infantry
- 23rd Ohio Infantry (notable members included Eliakim P. Scammon, Rutherford B. Hayes, James Comly and William McKinley)
- 36th Ohio Infantry (notable members included George Crook)
- 1st Ohio Artillery
