= Battle of Princeton Court House =

Battle of the American Civil War

Coordinates: 37.3657°N 81.1017°W

- Part of the American Civil War
Date	May 15–17, 1862
Location	Mercer County, West Virginia
Result	Confederate victory

Belligerents
United States of America (Union)	(Confederate States of America) CSA (Confederacy)

Commanders and leaders
Jacob Dolson Cox	Humphrey Marshall

Units involved
Kanawha Division	Army of East Kentucky; Department of Southwest Virginia

Casualties and losses
113 total 23 killed 69 wounded 21 missing	16 total 4 killed 12 wounded

The Battle of Princeton Court House was fought May 15–17, 1862 in Mercer County, Virginia (now West Virginia) in conjunction with Stonewall Jackson's Valley Campaign. It was a minor victory for the Confederate States Army.

== Background ==
By early May 1862, Union forces were positioned to invade Virginia at two places. Brig. Gen. Robert H. Milroy's column, its axis of march the Staunton-Parkersburg Turnpike, advanced from Cheat Mountain and occupied in succession Camp Allegheny, Monterey, McDowell, and Shenandoah Mountain. Retreating before the oncoming Federals, Confederate Brig. Gen. Edward "Allegheny" Johnson pulled back to Westview, six miles west of Staunton.

== Order of Battle ==
Union Forces - Gen. Jacob D. Cox

- Simmonds' Battery Kentucky Light Artillery
- 28th Ohio Infantry Regiment
- 34th Ohio Infantry Regiment
- 37th Ohio Infantry Regiment
- 2nd West Virginia Cavalry (detachment)

Confederate Forces - Gen. Humphrey Marshall

- 51st Virginia Infantry

== Battle ==
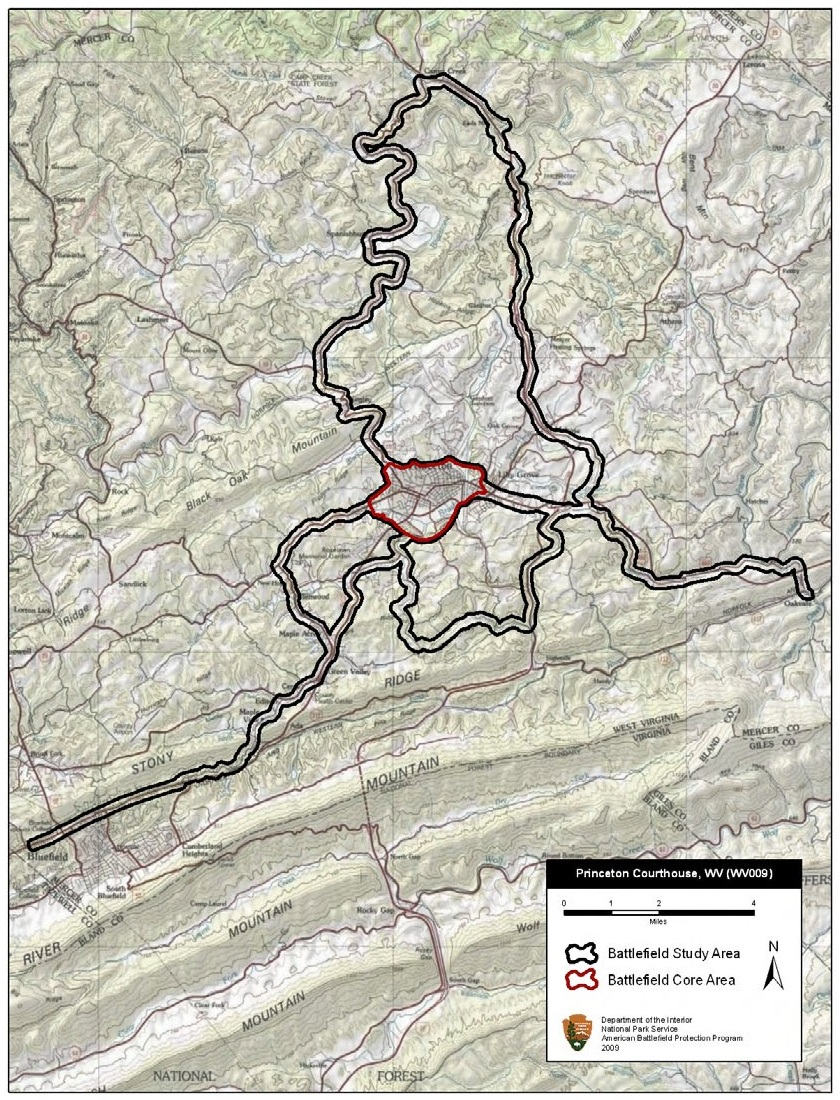
Map of Princeton Court House Battlefield core and study areas by the American Battlefield Protection Program.

Union soldiers of Brig. Gen. Jacob D. Cox's District of Kanawha threatened the Virginia and Tennessee Railroad. By mid-May, the Federals, although ousted from Pearisburg, held Mercer County and braced for a lunge at the railroad. Confederate Brig. Gen. Humphrey Marshall arrived from Abingdon, Virginia, with the Army of East Kentucky.

Seizing the initiative, Marshall bested Cox's 1st and 2nd brigades during three days of fighting, May 15 to May 17, in Mercer County, centering on Princeton Courthouse. There were 129 casualties in total.

== Aftermath ==
Breaking contact with the Confederates on the night of May 17, Cox withdrew 20 miles (30 km). Col. George Crook, commanding Cox's 3rd brigade, marched to and occupied the city of Lewisburg, where on May 23 he defeated Brig. Gen. Henry Heth's larger brigade in the Battle of Lewisburg. Crook withdrew upon learning that Thomas J. "Stonewall" Jackson's army had routed a Union division at Winchester on May 25.
