= XXIII Corps =

23 Corps, 23rd Corps, Twenty Third Corps, or XXIII Corps may refer to:

== Germany ==
- XXIII Reserve Corps, Imperial German Army, World War I
- XXIII Army Corps (Wehrmacht), World War II

== Italy ==
- XXIII Army Corps (Italy)

== Russia and Soviet Union ==
=== Russian Empire ===
- 23rd Army Corps (Russian Empire)

=== Soviet Union ===
- 23rd Mechanized Corps
- 23rd Rifle Corps
- 23rd Tank Corps

== United Kingdom ==
- XXIII Corps (United Kingdom)

=== Artillery Volunteer Corps ===
- 23rd (Chorley) Lancashire Artillery Volunteer Corps

=== Rifle Volunteer Corps ===
- 23rd (Glossop) Derbyshire Rifle Volunteer Corps
- 23rd (Chudleigh) Devonshire Rifle Volunteer Corps
- 23rd Middlesex Rifle Volunteer Corps
- 23rd (Inns of Court) Middlesex Rifle Volunteer Corps
- 23rd (Rotherhithe) Surrey Rifle Volunteer Corps

== United States ==
- XXIII Corps (United States)
- XXIII Corps (Union Army), American Civil War

== See also ==
- List of military corps by number
- 23rd Army (disambiguation)
- 23rd Battalion (disambiguation)
- 23rd Brigade (disambiguation)
- 23rd Division (disambiguation)
- 23rd Regiment (disambiguation)
- 23rd Squadron (disambiguation)
- 23rd (disambiguation)
