= 23rd Army =

23rd Army may refer to:

- 23rd Army (People's Republic of China)
- Twenty-Third Army (Japan), World War II
- 23rd Air Army, Russia/Soviet Union
- 23rd Army (Soviet Union)

== See also ==
- List of armies by number
- XXIII Corps (disambiguation)
- 23rd Division (disambiguation)
- 23rd Brigade (disambiguation)
- 23rd Regiment (disambiguation)
- 23rd Battalion (disambiguation)
- 23rd Squadron (disambiguation)
- 23rd (disambiguation)
