= 23rd =

23rd is the ordinal form of the number 23. 23rd or Twenty-third may also refer to:

- A fraction, 1/23, equal to one of 23 equal parts
- 23rd of the month, a recurring calendar date

== Geography ==
- 23rd meridian east, a line of longitude
- 23rd meridian west, a line of longitude
- 23rd parallel north, a circle of latitude
- 23rd parallel south, a circle of latitude
- 23rd Avenue
- 23rd Street (disambiguation)

== Military ==
- 23rd Army (disambiguation)
- 23rd Battalion (disambiguation)
- 23rd Brigade (disambiguation)
- 23rd Division (disambiguation)
- 23rd Regiment (disambiguation)
- 23rd Squadron (disambiguation)

== Other ==
- Twenty-third Amendment (disambiguation)
- 23rd century
- 23rd century BC
- "The 23rd", title of a season 1 episode of New Girl

== See also ==
- 23 (disambiguation)
- The Twenty-Third Man, 1957 British mystery detective novel
