= 23rd Division =

23rd Division may refer to:

== Infantry divisions ==
- 23rd Division (People's Republic of China)
- Finnish 23rd Division (Winter War), part of Finnish II Corps
- 23rd Division (German Empire)
- 23rd Landwehr Division, German Empire
- 23rd Reserve Division, German Empire
- 23rd Infantry Division (Wehrmacht), Germany
- 23rd SS Volunteer Panzer Grenadier Division Nederland, Germany
- 23rd Waffen Mountain Division of the SS Kama (2nd Croatian), Germany
- 23rd Infantry Division (India)
- 23rd Takavar Division, Iranian Army
- 23rd Infantry Division "Ferrara", Kingdom of Italy
- 23rd Division (Imperial Japanese Army)
- 23rd Infantry Division (Ottoman Empire)
- 23rd Infantry Division (Poland)
- 23rd Infantry Division (Russian Empire)
- 23rd Division (South Vietnam)
- 23rd Guards Mechanized Division, Soviet Union
- 23rd Guards Motor Rifle Division, Soviet Union
- 23rd Guards Rifle Division, Soviet Union
- 23rd Rifle Division, Soviet Union
- 23rd Division (Syrian rebel group)
- 23rd Division (United Kingdom)
- 23rd (Northumbrian) Division, United Kingdom
- 23rd Infantry Division (United States)
- 23rd Division (Yugoslav Partisans)

== Cavalry divisions ==
- 23rd Cavalry Division (United States)

== Armoured divisions ==
- 23rd Panzer Division, Wehrmacht, Germany

== Aviation divisions ==
- 23rd Air Division, United States

== Anti-air divisions ==
- 23rd Anti-Aircraft Artillery Division, Soviet Union

== Fictional divisions ==
- 23rd Airborne Division, from the American TV series Army Wives

== See also ==
- List of military divisions by number
- 23rd Army (disambiguation)
- XXIII Corps (disambiguation)
- 23rd Brigade (disambiguation)
- 23rd Regiment (disambiguation)
- 23rd Battalion (disambiguation)
- 23rd Squadron (disambiguation)
