= 23rd Cavalry =

23rd Cavalry may refer to:

== Divisions ==
- 23rd Cavalry Division (Soviet Union)
- 23rd Cavalry Division (United States)

== Regiments and companies ==
- 23rd Alberta Rangers
- 23rd Cavalry Regiment (United States)
- 23rd Punjab Cavalry (Frontier Force)
- 23rd (Lancashire) Company, Imperial Yeomanry

=== American Civil War units ===
==== Confederate Army ====
- 23rd Arkansas Infantry Regiment, occasionally referred to as the "23rd Arkansas Cavalry Regiment"
- 23rd Texas Cavalry Regiment
- 23rd Virginia Cavalry Regiment

== See also ==
- 23rd Division (disambiguation)
- 23rd Regiment (disambiguation)
- 23rd (disambiguation)
