= NS23 =

NS23, NS 23, NS-23, NS.23, or variation, may refer to:

== Places ==
- Somerset MRT station (station code: NS23), Orchard, Singapore; a mass transit station
- Glace Bay-Dominion (constituency N.S. 23), Nova Scotia, Canada; a provincial electoral district

== Other uses ==
- Nudelman-Suranov NS-23, a 23mm Soviet aircraft autocannon
- New Penguin Shakespeare volume 23
- Blue Origin NS-23, a suborbital spaceflight by the New Shepard

== See also ==
- NS (disambiguation)
- 23 (disambiguation)
