= 23rd Brigade =

23rd Brigade may refer to:

== Australia ==
- 23rd Brigade (Australia)

== British India ==
- 23rd Indian Infantry Brigade

== Germany ==
- Gebirgsjäger Brigade 23

== Greece ==
- 23rd Armoured Brigade (Greece)

== Iran ==
- 23rd Airborne Special Forces Brigade, or 23rd Special Forces Brigade, former name of 65th Airborne Special Forces Brigade

== Liberia ==
- 23rd Infantry Brigade (Liberia)

== Russia/Soviet Union ==
- 23rd Rocket Brigade

== Ukraine ==
- 23rd Airborne Brigade (Ukraine)
- 23rd Mechanized Brigade (Ukraine)
- 23rd Public Order Brigade (Ukraine)

== United Kingdom ==
- 23rd Armoured Brigade (United Kingdom)
- 23rd Infantry Brigade (United Kingdom)
- 23rd (Nigerian) Brigade, later 1st (West Africa) Infantry Brigade, a World War II brigade
- 23rd Reserve Brigade
- 23rd Brigade Royal Field Artillery

== United States ==
- 23rd Quartermaster Brigade

== See also ==
- 23rd Division (disambiguation)
- 23rd Regiment (disambiguation)
- 23rd Battalion (disambiguation)
- 23 Squadron (disambiguation)
