= 23rd Infantry Regiment =

23rd Infantry Regiment may refer to the following units:

- 23rd Infantry Regiment (Imperial Japanese Army)
- 23rd Infantry Regiment (United States)
- 23rd Infantry Regiment "Como"

== See also ==
- 23rd Regiment (disambiguation), including state infantry regiments that served in the American Civil War
