= 12th Ohio Infantry Regiment =

- Active: 1861–1864
- Country: United States
- Allegiance: Union
- Branch: Union Army
- Type: Infantry
- Size: ~1000 soldiers at outset of the war
- Engagements: American Civil War: Battle of Scary Creek; Battle of Carnifex Ferry; Battle of South Mountain; Battle of Antietam; Battle of Cloyd's Mountain; Battle of Lynchburg

Commanders
- Notable commanders: Col. John W. Lowe; Col. Carr B. White

12th Ohio Infantry Regiment was an infantry regiment in the Union Army during the American Civil War.

== History ==
The 12th Ohio Infantry Regiment was organized at Camp Dennison, Cincinnati, Ohio, on May 3, 1861, for three-months service, and reorganized on June 28 for three years, under Colonel John W. Lowe, who was killed early in the war and was succeeded by Col. Carr B. White. The 12th Ohio served in western Virginia until August 1862, when it was transferred to the Army of the Potomac and participated in the battles of Second Bull Run, South Mountain and Antietam.

In the fall of 1862, it was again transferred to western Virginia and did efficient service until the spring of 1864, when it joined Hunter's expedition to Lynchburg, Virginia. The regiment returned to Columbus, Ohio, and was mustered out July 11, 1864.

Union Army Brigadier General Jacob Ammen began his Civil War service as a captain in the 12th Ohio Infantry before being promoted to command the 24th Ohio Infantry Regiment.

Harrison G. Otis served as a Sergeant, and then Lieutenant, in Companies I and B before transferring to the 23rd Ohio Infantry and being wounded at the Second Battle of Kernstown.

The 12th Ohio Infantry sustained 455 men killed, wounded and missing.
