= 23 =

23 may refer to:

- 23 (number), the natural number following 22 and preceding 24
- one of the years 23 BC, AD 23, 1923, 2023

== Science ==
- Vanadium, a transition metal in the periodic table
- 23 Thalia, an asteroid in the asteroid belt

== Film and television ==
- 23 (film), a 1998 German film
- "23" (Will & Grace), a 2003 episode of the sitcom
- The Number 23, a 2007 film starring Jim Carrey
- "The Number 23" (Ugly Betty episode) or East Side Story, 2007

== Music ==
- 23, a German rap duo composed of Bushido and Sido
- Spiral Tribe
- Network 23 (record label)

=== Albums ===
- 23 (23 album), 2011, by German rappers Bushido and Sido alias 23
- 23 (Blonde Redhead album), 2007
- 23 (Rythem album), the third album from the Japanese duo, Rythem
- 23 (Enterprise Earth EP), 2014
- 23 (Shadow Child EP), 2012, featuring Tymer
- 23 (The Silents EP), 2007
- 23 (mixtape), 2022, the second mixtape by Central Cee
- Untitled #23, a 2009 album by The Church
- Twentythree, a 2005 album by Tristan Prettyman
- Twentythree, by the band Carbon Based Lifeforms

=== Songs ===
- "23" (Shakira song), a song by Shakira from Shakira
- "23" (Chayce Beckham song)
- "23" (Mike Will Made It song), featuring Miley Cyrus, Wiz Khalifa and Juicy J
- "23" (Sam Hunt song)
- "Twenty-Three" (song), by IU
- "23", a song by German rap duo 23 (Bushido and Sido) from the album 23
- "23", a song by Blonde Redhead from 23
- "23", a song by Jimmy Eat World from their 2004 album Futures
- "23", a song by Maluma from F.A.M.E
- "23", a song by Reneé Rapp from Snow Angel
- "23", a song by Saweetie from High Maintenance
- "23", a song by Simon Neale as Shadow Child
- "23", a song by Enterprise Earth from their 2014 EP 23
- "23", a song by The Silents from 23
- "23", a song by Chase Atlantic from Part Three
- "23", a song by Lawrence from Family Business
- "Twenty Three", a song by Big John
- "Twenty Three", a song by Duffy
- "Twentythree" by Yellowcard
- "Twenty-Three, for 13 violins, 5 violas & 5 cellos", a 1988 composition by John Cage
- "Twenty Three", a song by Karma to Burn from the album Arch Stanton, 2014

== Other uses ==
- 23 (numerology) or 23 enigma, a superstitious belief in the significance of the number 23
- 23 Stirling–St Andrews, a withdrawn bus service in Scotland
- Twenty-Three (short story collection), a 1962 collection of short stories by John Morrison
- Thee Temple ov Psychick Youth

== See also ==
- 23 skidoo (disambiguation)
- 23rd (disambiguation)
- List of highways numbered 23
- Line 23 (disambiguation)
