= Nyutabaru Air Base =

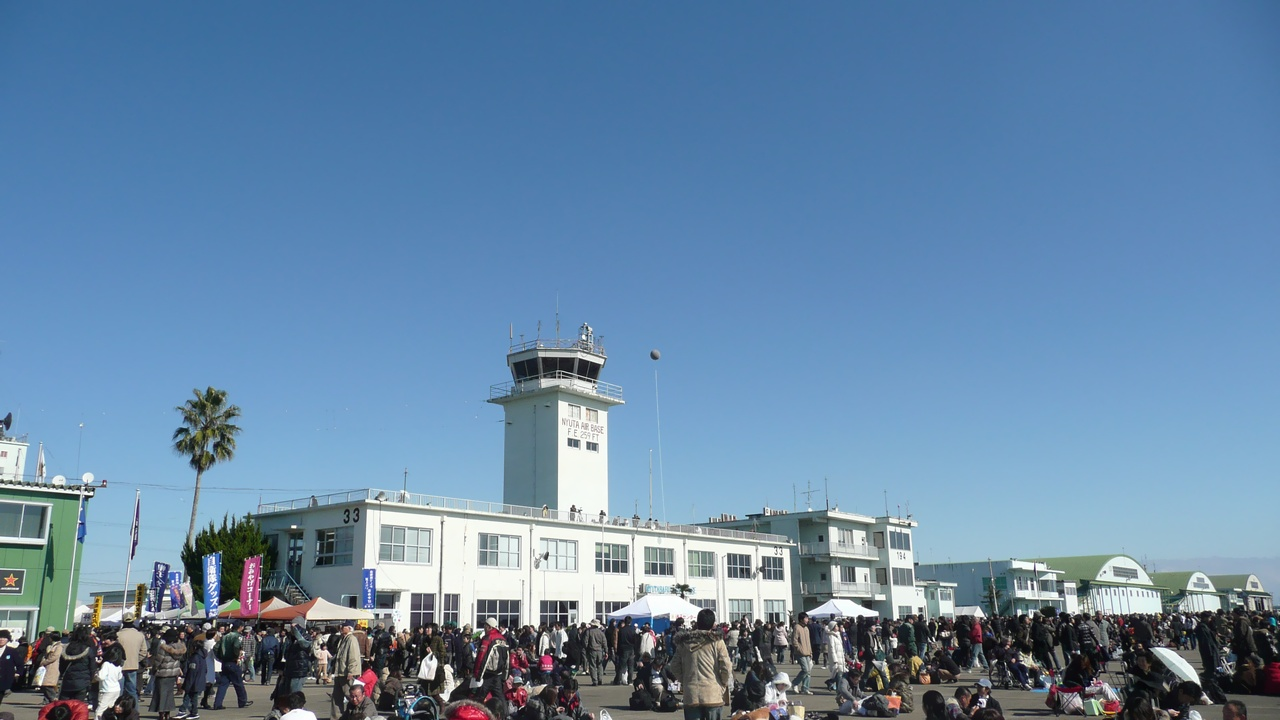
- IATA: none; ICAO: RJFN

Summary
- Airport type: Military
- Operator: Japan Air Self-Defense Force
- Location: Shintomi, Japan
- Elevation AMSL: 259 ft / 79 m
- Coordinates: 32°05′01″N 131°27′05″E

Map
- Location in Japan RJFN (Japan)

Runways
Direction	Length		Surface
Direction	m	ft	Surface
10/28	2,700	8,858	Asphalt concrete
- Source: Japanese AIP at AIS Japan

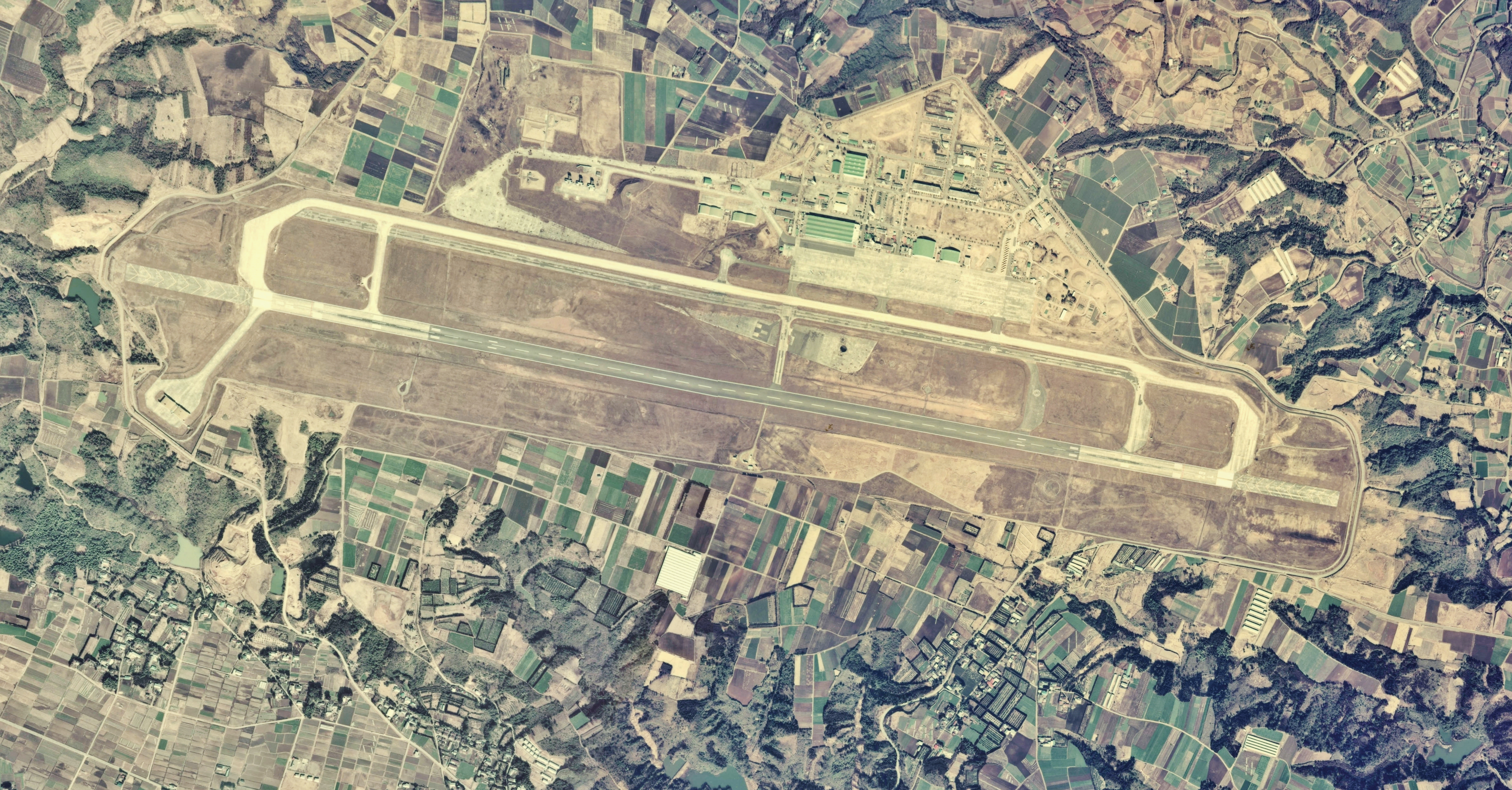
Nyutabaru Air Base

Nyutabaru Air Base (新田原基地, Nyūtabaru Kichi) (ICAO: RJFN) is a military aerodrome of the Japan Air Self-Defense Force (JASDF). It is located in the town of Shintomi, approximately 10.5 NM (19.4 km; 12.1 mi) north of the city Miyazaki in Miyazaki Prefecture, Japan, on the eastern coast of Kyushu. It is the headquarters for the JASDF 5th Air Wing. It is also known as the former home of the flight instruction group, which was made up of the most highly skilled pilots in Japan. The base area is 9,135 square kilometres (3,527 sq mi).

== History ==
The base was opened on 17 July 1940 as the Nyūtabaru Air Field of the Imperial Japanese Army Air Corps and a branch of the Kumagaya Army Flight School was established. On 1 October, the base became a branch of the Tachiarai Army Flight School. In October 1941 the Army Parachute Training Department, the training unit of the Imperial Army Parachute Corps, was relocated from Baicheng in Manchukuo. In April 1944, the Army Aviation Communication School Nyūtabaru Education Corps was formed. However, with the surrender of Japan in August 1945, the base was abolished.

The base remained abandoned for over a decade until the runway was rebuilt on 1 December 1957 and the base re-opened as a training facility housing the 3rd Pilot School Nyūtabaru branch of the Japan Air Self-Defence Force, equipped with Lockheed T-33 jet trainers. The 3rd Pilot School Nyūtabaru branch was renamed the 17th Flight Education Group on June 1, 1959.

On 15 July 1961 the 5th Air Wing and 6th Squadron were relocated to Nyūtabaru from Matsushima Air Field. On 8 January 1962, the JASDF 10th Squadron, equipped with North American F-86Fs was formed. The 17th Flight Education Group was abolished the following year. In February 1963, the 10th Squadron relocated to Tsuiki Air Base and in March the JASDF 202nd Squadron, equipped with Lockheed F-104DJ/Js was formed. The 6th Squadron also relocated to Tsuiki Air Base in October, and the JASDF 204th Squadron (also equipped with F-104DJ/J's was formed.

On 26 July 1971 an F-104 from Nyūtabaru overran the runway on takeoff and crashed into a hillside, causing a huge fire. One crew member was killed. On 11 April 1973 a Mitsubishi MU-2 attached to the base crashed during training, killing four crew members.

In 1980, 179.28 hectares of the base was provided to U.S. Forces in Japan as a temporary joint use per the U.S.–Japan Status of Forces Agreement (Facility/area name: Nyutabaru Air Base, FAC 5115) . On 21 December 1982, the 202nd Squadron transitioned from the F-104 to the McDonnell Douglas F-15 EagleDJ/J. In 1985, the 204th Squadron also transitioned to the F-15DJ/J and was transferred to Hyakuri Air Base, with the JASDF 301st Squadron (McDonnell Douglas F-4 Phantom II|McDonnell Douglas F-4EJ) relocating from Hyakuri to Nyūtabaru. In April 1990 the Flight Instruction Group also upgraded from the Mitsubishi T-2 to the F-15DJ.

On 6 October 2000, the 202nd Squadron was abolished and the Flight Education Wing (23rd Squadron) is formed, using F-15DJ aircraft. The Flight Instructor Group relocated to Komatsu Air Base in 2014 and was replaced by the JASDF 305th Squadron (F-15DJ/J) from Hyakuri Air Base. The 301st Squadron was also relocated to Hyakuri in October, 2014. On 20 October 2018, the government announced a plan to develop ammunition depots and parking areas for the US military at Nyūtabaru.

On 26 July 2023 French Air and Space Force Dassault Rafale visited Nyūtabaru as part of France's overseas deployment training "Mission Pégase". This was the first time that French Air Force fighter jets have visited Japan since World War II.

In July 2021, Japan's Defense Minister, Nobuo Kishi, announced that the base will host the F-35Bs of the JASDF. A total of 42 F-35B variants will be acquired, introducing 18 by FY2023, six in FY2024 and two in FY2025. These are to form a single squadron consisting of about 20 aircraft. The base is located in close proximity to the Japan Maritime Self Defense Force's Kure Base in Hiroshima Prefecture, which is the home port of JS Kaga, one of two Japanese carriers being converted to operate the F-35B.

== Tenant squadrons ==
- 305th Tactical Fighter Squadron (F-15J)
- Fighter Training Group
  - 23rd Flying Training Squadron (F-15J)
- Air Rescue Wing Nyutabaru Detachment (UH-60J & U-125A)
