= Fighter Training Group (JASDF) =

- 飛行教育航空隊
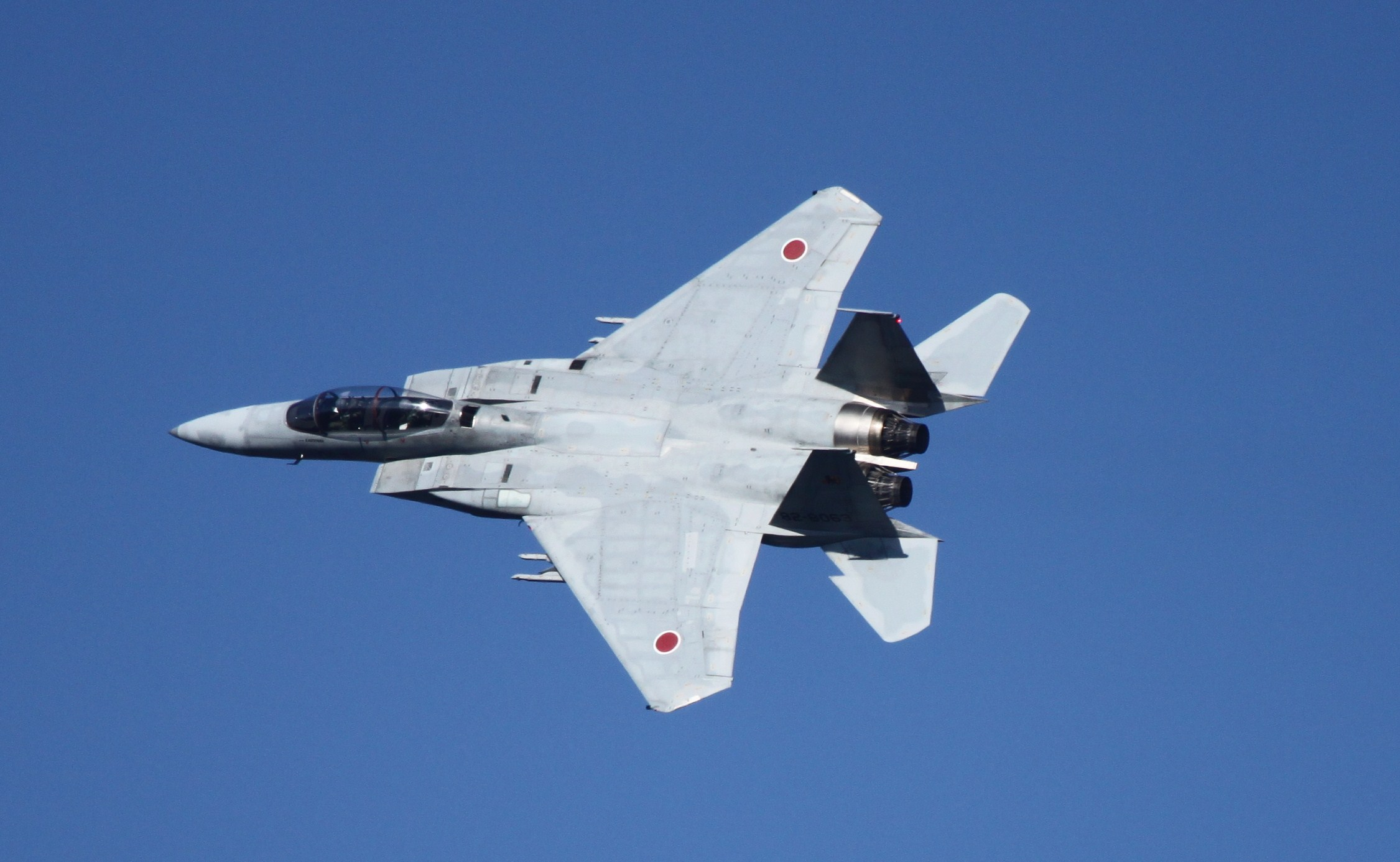
- 23rd Squadron Mitsubishi F-15DJ (2010)
- Active: October 6, 2000
- Country: Japan
- Allegiance: Air Training Command
- Branch: Japan Air Self-Defense Force
- Garrison/HQ: Nyutabaru Air Base

The Tactical Fighter Training Group (飛行教育航空隊, hikoukyoukukoukuutai) is a training unit belonging to Air Training Command of the Japan Air Self-Defense Force based at Nyutabaru Air Base in Miyazaki Prefecture, Japan. It consists of the 23rd Flying Training Squadron.

== Aircraft operated ==
- Mitsubishi F-15J/DJ (2000–present)
- Kawasaki T-4 (2000–present)
