= Skidoo =

Skidoo may refer to:

- Ski-Doo, a brand of snowmobiles produced by Bombardier Recreational Products
  - from this, skidoo as a generic term for all snowmobiles in much of Canada and other parts of the world
- Skidoo, California, a ghost town in the United States
- Skidoo (film), a 1968 film starring Jackie Gleason, Groucho Marx, and Carol Channing
  - Skidoo (soundtrack), an album by Harry Nilsson, the original soundtrack recording for the film Skidoo
- "Skidooing," a term used in the TV series Blue's Clues to denote the act of jumping into an object, typically a picture, thus teleporting oneself to another place.

== See also ==
- 23 skidoo (disambiguation)
- Skiddaw, a mountain in the Lake District in England
