= Route 23 (disambiguation) =

Route 23 may refer to:

- Route 23 (MTA Maryland), a bus route in Baltimore, Maryland and its suburbs
- Route 23 (MBTA), a bus route in Boston, US
- London Buses route 23, a bus route in London, UK
- SEPTA Route 23, bus route and former streetcar line in Philadelphia.

== See also ==
- List of highways numbered 23
- Line 23 (disambiguation)
