= 23 skidoo (disambiguation) =

23 skidoo is an American slang phrase from 1906.

23 skidoo (or 23 skiddoo) may also refer to:

- 23 Skidoo (band), a British post-punk, ethnic fusion and industrial music band
- 23 Skidoo (film), a 1964 short experimental film by Julian Biggs
- Secret Agent 23 Skidoo, American Kid-Hop musician

== See also ==
- Skidoo (disambiguation)
- 23 (disambiguation)
- 23 enigma
