= Twenty-third of the month =

Recurring ordinal calendar date

The twenty-third of the month or twenty-third day of the month is the recurring calendar date position corresponding to the day numbered 23 of each month. In the Gregorian calendar (and other calendars that number days sequentially within a month), this day occurs in every month of the year, and therefore occurs twelve times per year.

- Twenty-third of January
- Twenty-third of February
- Twenty-third of March
- Twenty-third of April
- Twenty-third of May
- Twenty-third of June
- Twenty-third of July
- Twenty-third of August
- Twenty-third of September
- Twenty-third of October
- Twenty-third of November
- Twenty-third of December

In addition to these dates, this date occurs in months of many other calendars, such as the Bengali calendar and the Hebrew calendar.

== See also ==
- 23rd (disambiguation)
