= 23rd Ohio Infantry Regiment =

- Active: 1861–1865
- Country: United States
- Allegiance: Union
- Branch: Union Army
- Type: Regiment
- Size: 950 soldiers at outset of the war
- Engagements: Carnifex Ferry; Giles Court House; South Mountain; Antietam; Morgan's Raid; Buffington Island; Cloyd's Mountain; Lynchburg; Second Kernstown; Shenandoah Valley Campaign; Third Winchester; Fisher's Hill; Cedar Creek

Commanders
- Notable commanders: William S. Rosecrans; Eliakim P. Scammon; Rutherford B. Hayes

The 23rd Ohio Infantry Regiment was an infantry regiment in the Union Army during much of the American Civil War. It served in the Eastern Theater in a variety of campaigns and battles, and is remembered with a stone memorial on the Antietam National Battlefield not far from Burnside's Bridge.

The regiment later became noted for its many up-and-coming politicians. Future presidents Rutherford B. Hayes and William McKinley served in this unit, as did future U.S. senator and associate justice of the United States Supreme Court Stanley Matthews and Robert P. Kennedy, a future U.S. Congressman. Other notable officers included James M. Comly and Eliakim P. Scammon, both of whom became influential nationally after the war. Harrison Gray Otis, the famed owner and publisher of the Los Angeles Times, also fought with the 23rd Ohio during the war. All told, before the regiment was mustered out at war's end, it had seen five generals serve in it.

== Service ==
Under the first call of President Abraham Lincoln, Ohio sent to the field 22 regiments of infantry, each having been enlisted for three months only. While these organizations organized for three months' service, Lincoln issued a call for a further 300,000 men for three years enlistment. Nearly all the companies which became the 23rd Ohio were then waiting to muster in for three months in different parts of Ohio. These·companies were the Bellefontaine Rifles from Logan County, the Cleveland Rifle Grenadiers with men from both Cleveland in Cuyahoga County and Wellington in Lorain County, (Note: This company became Company D.) the Ellsworth Guards from Ashland County, the Elyria Rifle Guards from Lorain County, the Galion Guards of Crawford County, Giddings's Zouaves from Ashtabula County, (Note: This company which became Company B, was led by the son of former congressman and abolitionist, Joshua Giddings, Capt. Grotius Giddings who not even into command left for a major's commission in the Regulars, the 14th U. S. Infantry, one of the new three-battalion regular infantry regiments (each battalion with eight companies) that was formimg at Fort Trumbull, Connecticut.) the Ohio Union Savers from Lake County, the Poland Guards from eastern Mahoning County, Ohio, (Note: This company contained future president McKinley, then an 18-year-old private, and became Company E.) the Welker Guards from Holmes and Ashland Counties, and the Zouave Light Guards from Cuyahoga County. These units were ordered to Camp Chase, near Columbus, and were re-enlisted for three years and assigned to the regiment. This made the 23rd Regiment the first three-year Ohio Volunteer Infantry regiment organized. Governor William Dennison soon gave commissions to several of the officers of the volunteer companies. The regiment mustered into duty on Tuesday, June 11, 1861, by Capt. Howard Stansberry, USA, as a three-year regiment.

Its 950 enlistees were originally led by Col. William Rosecrans. The other initial field officers were Lieutenant-Colonel Stanley Mathews and Major Rutherford B. Hayes, however, changes in the field/staff came quickly. That Friday, June 14, Rosecrans was promoted to Brigadier-General in the regular army. Wisely opting not to be promoted above their experience and ability, Matthews and Hayes asked for another regular officer to take command. In late June, 1837 West Point graduate and Mexican-American War veteran, Col. Eliakim P. Scammon succeeded Rosecrans in command. As well as the colonel and lieutenant-colonel, the quartermaster and adjutant were also promoted and transferred. They were replaced by promotions from the regiment, except for Major James M. Comly, who was transferred from the 63d Ohio. Hayes was promoted to lieutenant-colonel.

The 18-year-old Poland, Ohio resident, McKinley quickly adapted to army life and also wrote a series of letters to his hometown newspaper extolling the army and the Union cause. While at Camp Chase, their first shipment of official clothing contained only undershirts and drawers followed later by full uniforms. These delays in issuance of uniforms and weapons again brought the men into conflict with their officers, but recently appointed Major Hayes convinced them to accept what the government had issued them; his style in dealing with the men impressed McKinley, beginning an association and friendship that would last until Hayes's death in 1893. A few weeks later, though, the men were further disappointed when their first issue of arms were flintlock muskets on July 23. After much effort by the staff, the men accepted the arms.

=== 1861: Initial deployment ===
After training and drilling following their induction, on Thursday, July 25, 1861, the regiment was ordered to Clarksburg, for western Virginia, where it arrived by train on Saturday. It served for several months in this area of current West Virginia, helping to restore that portion of Virginia to the Union. The 23rd Ohio was attached to Jacob D. Cox's Kanawha Brigade and served throughout much of the war in what became the IX Corps.

Ordered to garrison the town of Weston, roughly 20 miles (32 km) away, the 23rd Ohio marched for two days through heavy rain followed by an intense heat. Scammon continually chided his raw recruits for their slow pace and for discarding equipment en route. (Note: McKinley later wrote that despite their complaints about Scammon's strict ways, he made the regiment better for it.) Shortly after arrival, Scammon was ordered to divide his command into two battalions of five companies to better counter the partisan threat. One battalion under Lt. Col. Mathews as a movable force, dedicated to counterinsurgency that was sent a further 20 miles (32 km) south to the vicinity of Bulltown and Sutton, under Matthews. The remaining battalion of five companies stayed at Weston with Scammon sending out occasional foraging and scouting expeditions against guerrillas and other disaffected inhabitants. This division of force elicited no response from the Rebel military who had suffered crushing defeats in the in western Virginia and opted not to devote many resources to what they deemed an area of relatively limited value.

In this area, the 23rd Ohio operated against numerous secessionist guerrillas there, performing hard duty, marching and countermarching over the rugged mountainous terrain drenched by almost continuous rain. Despite not being in the main theater of the war, life for the men in the regiment was often vicious and dangerous. It was an unpleasant constabulary duty that lacked the military glory many had sought to experience. They found the locals divided in their loyalties, with many serving in both Confederate and U. S. armies The 23rd Ohio was soon in a constant mode of incessant patrols chasing small bands of secessionist guerilla whose actions kept U.S. forces tied down and anxious. (Note: Armstrong writes in 2000, "From the beginning of their service, the Ohio soldiers were subject to attack whenever they were outside their camps. Teamsters were shot on the road; water supplies were poisoned; soldiers on the march were shot at from concealed positions; messengers were shot—one was found dead under his horse's head, stripped of everything but his shirt and pants. Even band members were in danger; a member of the 8th Ohio Infantry's band was shot and killed on the road. ... Scouting parties were continually sent out to hunt down the guerrillas.")

Hope for real action rose in mid-August when Scammon was ordered south to join Rosecrans force assembling to counter a Rebel offensive in the Kanawha Valley. This valley and county was the center of the slavery in what would soon be West Virginia. (Note: Per Mackenzie in 2010, "With over two thousand slaves, one-sixth of the total in the forty-eight counties, Kanawha County provides a useful example to show how slavery affected political, social, and economic relations among its residents. While salt furnaces substituted for cotton plantations there, local slaveholders exhibited many of the same traits as their eastern counterparts. The institution affected whites as much as slaves. As Eugene Genovese has pointed out, 'the paternalism of the planters towards their slaves was reinforced by the semi-paternal relationship between the planters and their neighbors' that made the planters 'the closest thing to feudal lords imaginable in a nineteenth-century bourgeois republic.') The salt industry had brought slavery into the mountains and made slave-owners extremely wealthy and politically powerful. The wealth of the slave owners and their dominance of the economy gave them a sense of entitlement when it came to local politics and laws requiring bonds to be posted before running for office as a nominal anti-corruption matter negated the gains of universal white suffrage in 1851. Due to the vocal unionist majority in the region, the local slave-owning elite had raised militia companies to assert political control over the county and when few volunteers responded to their calls for resistance to Federal forces entering the region, they appealed to Richmond to maintain their political control. This Rebel force, under former Virginia governor Henry A. Wise, entered the valley and immediately began asserting arresting Unionists and destroying their property. After winning the Battle of Scary Creek, Wise found himself facing greater enemy numbers and suffered a strategic defeat as he withdrew 100 miles (160 km) southeast to Greenbrier County.

In September, the Confederacy again tried to wrest control of the valley from the United States. In this part of then Virginia, the Carnifex Ferry was a key part of the major roads in the area. This ferry operated 8 miles (13 km) southwest of Summersville. It was, for many miles, practically the only crossing along the rugged Gauley River. In 1861, it was 370 feet in width and crossed by means of two flatboats. The road from the crossing wound along the base of the cliffs on the north side. On August 12, 1861, Brig. Gen. John Buchanan Floyd, former Secretary of War and like Wise – a former governor of Virginia, had entered Lewisburg with troops raised largely in southwestern Virginia. Advised to hold the ferry, but warned to stay on the south bank, he crossed the Gauley on Wednesday evening, August 22 and on August 26, attacked and routed Col. Erastus B. Tyler's 7th Ohio Infantry encamped at Kessler's Cross Lanes. After this battle, he returned to fortify the ferry from where he planned to move against Rosecrans by occupying Summersville, and sent Col. John McCausland, with the 36th Virginia Infantry (Second Kanawha), occupied the town of Summersville.

Upon entering the valley after Wise's withdrawal, the men of the 23rd Ohio and their comrades had been warmly welcomed into the area by many local citizens reflecting the loyalty division. Sgt. McKinley's passage through the town of Sutton exposed him to the devastation neighbor had wrought upon neighbor with few civilians about many dwellings destroyed and those that were not occupied by Federal troops. On Sunday, September 1, Matthews and his five companies reunited with the regiment at Bulltown, and the 23rd Ohio left for Sutton to join Rosecrans's Army of West Virginia. The regiment was now part of an army of 8,000—eight infantry regiments, three mounted batteries, and three cavalry companies—under Rosecrans' command, with the 23rd serving as the commander's bodyguard.

Scammon took command of the 3rd Brigade composed of the 23rd and 30th Ohio regiments. Due to Matthews' absence, Hayes took command of the regiment. Leaving a garrison of around 3,000 men at Sutton, the following Saturday, September 7, the army moved south towards Summersville. Rosecrans' expedition moved out of Sutton with a squadron of cavalry in front followed by pioneers. Next in the van was Benham's 1st Brigade followed by McCook's 2nd Brigade. The 3rd Brigade was the last combat unit in the column. Per Rosecrans' direction, Scammon had detailed six companies of the 30th Ohio to guard the a wagon train that trailed out for five miles. After a hard slog, Rosecrans had his men stop at Birch River Sunday evening where he received intelligence that Floyd was at the ferry.Late Monday morning, September 9, the march resumed and that night halted 8 miles (13 km) from Summersville, on Muddlety Creek, on the site of a former Confederate outpost.

As the 23rd Ohio and the Army of West Virginia approached, McCausland, recognizing he was isolated and outnumbered, had withdrawn to rejoin Floyd at the ferry on Sunday. Floyd now had about 2000 men in fortifications as the U.S. force of 5,000 approached. Scouts reported back to Rosecrans that the Rebels were still at the ferry.

At 4:00 am, on Tuesday, Rosecrans moved forward. The advance guard reached Summersville about 8:45 am. Near McKee's Creek Crossing was a road that led to Hughes Ferry on Gauley River, at the mouth of Salmon Run. McCook, with a cavalry escort, rode down to the river and was fired upon by a Confederate detachment. Four companies of the 10th Ohio then came to the rescue, and the ferry boat was secured and the march resumed. The road then led southwest to Kessler's Cross Lanes where Rosecrans paused 1 mile (1.6 km) from the crossroad for a short rest of short duration. He then sent Benham's 1st Brigade down the road leading from Cross Lanes to the ferry in line of battle, cautioning him not to bring on an engagement as while Floyd's general location was known, the disposition of his troops was not.

Meanwhile, Rosecrans climbed a steep hill to the right of the road, and with his field glass looked ahead of him. Far in front stood the 1st Brigade in line of battle, facing the river. The 2nd Brigade was on a slope to the left, and on the right, a little higher up, was the 3rd Brigade, containing the 23rd Ohio, in reserve facing the direction of the ferry.. He could see the heights beyond the Gauley River. As Benham advanced, his men made contact with a Rebel detachment of the 50th Virginia Infantry camped along the road. The Confederates retired to the main camp, while Rosecrans, in ignorance of the true situation, ordered Benham to send the 10th Ohio's four companies, which were 1 mile (1.6 km)ahead of the main body, down the road from Hughes Ferry, to scout the Rebel position, and support Benham's advance.

Suddenly the Federal advance guard made contact with the Confederate line barely 300 yards away. With woods lining the road on both sides, except for a cornfield along one side for part of the distance, the Rebels opened a heavy fire on the U.S. forces, and the battle began. The fighting at the Battle of Carnifex Ferry was a hard but relatively minor scrap. The 1st and 2nd Brigades assaulted the Rebels in a series of attacks through the afternoon but could not dislodge them.

Col. Smith and his 13th Ohio had been sent down into a wooded ravine on a reconnaissance to find the Rebels' right flank. After deploying in line of battle, he moved up the slope through the brush until he saw the enemy breastworks. Keeping behind the woods and the crest of a ridge in front of the Rebel line, he slipped further left until his men came under fire from the end of Floyd's right flank 100 yards (91 m) away. After having his men drop flat on the ground and crawl up to the ridge's crest, his men opened a heavy fire on the enemy that drove the Confederates away. Since he had been ordered to find the right flank but not bring on an engagement, the 13th Ohio did not pursue the fleeing Rebels. After receiving Smith's his findings, Rosecrans put together an ad hoc brigade to make a flank attack out of the ravine in his left. At Rosecrans' order, Scammon sent Hayes and four companies to the right of the enemy's entrenchments, taking position in the dense thicket in the ravine. There they joined the 28th Ohio, eight companies of the 13th Ohio, and two of the 12th Ohio regiments, placed under Smith's command. He was ordered to carry the works on the right by assault. Instructed to wait until dusk before launching the assault, the men waited in the woods that grew very dark quickly. The assault was bogged down by the darkness as the men struggled up the hill. After midnight, they reached the works and drove the Rebels back but the sheer exhaustion of being on the go for nearly 24 hours precluded further advance past the first entrenchments. The losses from the enemy fire, and some from friendly fire in the dark, were relatively light, but Hayes and his companies received their baptism of serious combat.

Initially uninvolved in the fighting, at 4:00 pm, Rosecrans ordered Scammon to form his brigade in line of battle on a hill fronting the Rebels' right. It was formed in two lines, the 23rd Ohio in front, and six companies of the 30th Ohio, in rear. (Note: Four companies of the 30th Ohio had remained in Suttton as the depot garrison.) Scammon placed Mack's Battery E, 4th U.S. Artillery of howitzers a little in advance of the infantry. At dusk, the 23rd was sent forward closer to the enemy works and to await further direction. An hour later, it was ordered back to its original position.

Although his men still held the north bank of the ferry, Floyd realized the folly of his crossing and his force was outnumbered. He decided to abandon his position and retreat across the Gauley River during the night. Heavy rains made the pursuit of the Rebels almost impossible, but it was still done capturing many prisoners. Rosecrans' chase continued to the Rebels' new entrenchments at the foot of B Sewell Mountain.

After remaining there a few days, the U.S. forces fell back to Camp Ewin on New River, a very unhealthy camp, where disease rapidly thinned the ranks. The regiment continued operations in Kanawha Valley and New River Region through October into November. On October 23, Mathews was made Colonel of the 51st Ohio, turning command over to Hayes. As Hayes was promptly promoted to succeed him and, with Scammon remaining brigade commander, found himself de facto commander of the regiment, a development that met with wide approval.

There was, however, no doubt some disappointment among the senior captains already with the regiment when Ohio Governor William Dennison dispatched Maj. James M. Comly to western Virginia to take Hayes' place. Meanwhile, the Confederates had sent Lee to counter the U.S. forces in the region, however, due to the weather and terrain he failed and by mid-November, through maneuver, Rosecrans' managed to force Floyd out of the Kanawha Valley. Shortly thereafter, as snow began to blanket the mountains, the regiment moved to Fayetteville, where it went into winter quarters at Fayette Court House in November. The winter of 1861 was devoted to recruiting, drilling, and discipline. Companies F and G detached under Major Comly, and on December 31, occupied Raleigh Court House without opposition. Over 300 stands of arms, 27 prisoners, and supplies were captured.

=== 1862: Operations in the Kanawha ===
Companies A and D were added to Colmly's detachment in the new year. On Monday, February 10, Comly marched his four companies 28 miles (45 km) from Raleigh to the mouth of Bluestone River, through a snowstorm, driving a Rebel infantry regiment and a small force of cavalry across the river. Inflicting a considerable loss on this force. The 23rd Ohio captured the Rebels' camps, tents, and forage. Rosecrans commended the force in general orders, for its bravery and efficiency.

The 23rd Ohio would finally turn in their flint-lock smoothbores for new percussion rifles in the new year, but they realized they were away from the main the war effort. Instead, Hayes and his men continued to engage in occupation duties in western Virginia as part of the 1st Brigade of Brig. Gen. Cox's Kanawha Division. (Note: Rosecrans had left for a more prestigious command in the West early in the year. His replacement was Maj. Gen. John C. Frémont.) They hunted whenever game was plentiful, drilled, patrolled, and entertained themselves. The men read the newspapers sent from home or purchased locally to keep up with war news, and Hayes regularly posted telegrams with war information for all the regiment to read winning the admiration and loyalty of many including McKinley. For his part, the now 19-year-old McKinley had already been recognized for his ability and worked as a clerk for the Quartermaster and occasionally filled in for the sick commissary sergeant. He performed capably and on Tuesday, April 15, was promoted to Commissary Sergeant when his predecessor was dischargeed for illness.

For the spring of 1862, Frémont had planned to gather his forces and cross over the mountains and unite with Banks' army in the Shenandoah Valley (and eventually with McDowell). Cox was originally going to his column when it approached Christiansburg. On April 17, 1862, a Thursday, the reunited regiment received orders to leave winter quarters and go into the field. The 23rd Ohio, on April 22, moved in the direction of Princeton, under command of Lt. Col. Hayes. Leading the federal advance, they reached Princeton Thursday, May 1. The Confederate forces began leaving the town on the Federals' approach and set fire to the town. From the next week, nothing but foraging and skirmishing occurred.

Despite an initial defeat of Jackson and his army at Kernstown, U.S. forces were routed by Jackson and his army when he attacked them in detail. After he defeated Frémont's subordinates, Milroy and Schenck, at McDowel, he pulled his forces back west over the mountains into West Virginia. Frémont telegraphed Cox that "his plans were suspended, and that I must look out for myself."

The enemy had made strong efforts to concentrate a sufficient force to protect the Virginia & Tennessee Railroad (V&TRR) and to reassert political control and economic control of the salt industry in the region. As part of this effort, on Thursday morning, May 8, four Rebel infantry regiments and six pieces of artillery, under Brig. Gen. Heth attacked the 23rd Ohio at Princeton. Only nine companies were present and three small companies of cavalry. Despite two of the cavalry companies retreating after first contact, the regiment held firm until overwhelmed and forced make an orderly, fighting retreat. The 23rd Ohio fell back to the northeast, being pursued by the enemy to the narrows of New River. The enemy's actions isolated the 23rd but in the night, Cox marched reinforcements to Princeton from East River and the Rebels out in turn. While the 23rd regrouped, the General Assembly of the Restored Government of Virginia passed an act on May 13, 1862, granting permission for the creation of West Virginia, which further motivated local secessionists and their compatriots in Richmond.

Cox gathered his two brigades at Princeton nine days later, on May 17, and offered battle in front of the town. Although the Rebels took strong positions on the hills south the town, they did not attack but remained the victors of the field having inflicted casualties on the 23rd Ohio and the cavalry on May 8. Cox realized Princeton could easily be turned by roads on the west and decided to retreat northwest to Flat Top Mountain, a stronger position. On Sunday, May 18, after destroying tents, camp, and garrison equipage, the regiment left Princeton and returned to Flat Top Mountain, after having endured excessive hardships, defeat, and food shortages.

The regiment remained at Flat Top Mountain until Sunday, July 13, when it was ordered northeast to Green Meadows, 7 miles (11 km) from Pack's Ferry, on New River. A month later, Friday, August 15, Cox was ordered to march through the mountains by way of Staunton, and join Maj. Gen. Pope who commanded the newly created Army of Virginia, at Charlottesville. (Note: Rather than serve under Pope, Frémont claiming seniority, resigned rather than serve under him.) Having several detachments out pursuing guerrillas and scattered bands of Confederate troops operating in his rear near the Kentucky line, he would not be able to move for a few days. While concentrating his troops at Flat Top Mountain, Cox explained to Pope, by telegraph, that marching to Charlottesville meant fifteen days of uninterrupted mountain travel through a wilderness destitute of supplies with enemy guerrillas nipping at his heels, nevermind that there was the very serious question of whether Pope would be there on schedule as Cox approached that place. Cox suggested instead that he could reach Pope in ten days or less via steamboat and railroad. Pope, with Halleck's assent, gave permission to do that on the same day.

The 23rd Ohio was ordered to march, with all possible dispatch, to meet the rest of Cox's Division at Camp Platt, the head of navigation on the Kanawha, where the regiment arrived on Monday afternoon, and embarked on river transports, having marched 104 miles (167 km) in a little more than three days. Traveling down the Kanawha and then up the Ohio to Parkersburg, the 23rd Ohio boarded the last train moving Cox's division on the Baltimore & Ohio Railroad (B&O) to Washington, DC, arriving on Monday, August 25.

Other regiments had joined Pope to the south, but the 23rd Ohio remained with Cox just across the Potomac from the capital and was ordered into the fort on Upton's Hill to cover the front of Washington toward Centreville. During the Second Battle of Bull Run, the men could hear the sound of artillery from the direction of the battlefield. They soon saw army wagons, ambulances with the wounded, marching troops, and couriers passing by them to and from the battle assessing the scene. Hayes later wrote that none of these troops the observed were superior to his own regiment.

=== With the Army of the Potomac, at South Mountain and Antietam ===
Maryland Campaign, actions September 3–20, 1862 Confederate Union

Despite significant Confederate manpower losses over the spring and summer campaigns, Lee decided to invade Maryland and Pennsylvania, and cut off the B&O from Washington threatening the capital and Baltimore, to "annoy and harass the enemy." This invasion would relieve pressure on Virginia's agriculture, lower Northern morale and adversely influence the upcoming mid-term Congressional elections of 1862 approaching in November, incite an uprising in Maryland, and gain foreign recognition by an Army of Northern Virginia (ANV) victory on Northern soil.

After Pope's defeat, Lincoln reluctantly turned back to Maj. Gen. McClellan who repaired the Army of the Potomac (AoP) after the First Battle of Bull Run and could do it again. On September 2, Lincoln named McClellan to command "the fortifications of Washington, and all the troops for the defense of the capital." McClellan, a strong organizer and a skilled trainer of troops, took command of the AoP, bolstered by units absorbed from Pope's army, included six infantry corps, about 102,000 men. The 23rd Ohio arrived in Washington, and camped in Northern Virginia, across the Potomac at Upton Hill. The regiment was brigaded along with other troops from the Kanawha in the 1st Brigade of the Kanawha Division. Col. Scammon being the senior colonel took command of the 1st Brigade and the 39-year-old Hayes assumed command of the regiment. (Note: The 23rd Ohio was in the brigade with the 12th and 30th Ohio Infantry regiments, the Ohio Light Artillery, 1st Battery, and Gilmore's and Harrison's Companies, West Virginia Cavalry.) On Friday, September 5, the 23rd Ohio and its division were ordered to march to Leesboro (present-day Wheaton, MD ) to join the Hooker's I and Burnside's IX Corps. (Note: IX Corps, created July 22d, 18G2, was composed of the command that Burnside brought from North Carolina.) Leaving at daybreak Saturday, Cox and his men crossed the Potomac, marched through the city, and arrived late afternoon in Leesboro. Sometime on Sunday or Monday, the Kanawha Division was assigned to Burnside's IX Corps as its 4th Division.

McClellan's AoP left Washington starting on September 7 with his 87,000-man army in a slow pursuit. Naturally cautious, he assumed he would be facing over 120,000 Confederates, and as a result, argued with Washington that the forces defending the capital report to him. The Kanawha Division had joined an AoP with low morale after its defeats on the Peninsula and at Second Bull Run, but upon moving northwest into Maryland, the morale rose due to the "friendly, almost tumultuous welcome" that they received from the citizens of the state. (Note: As McPherson and other historians have noted, this was a contrast to the reception of the Confederate invasion which was lukewarm at best and hostile at most, despite the state being a slave state.) McClellan had organized his army into three wings as he moved northwest in pursuit of Lee. Burnside, as the Right Wing, now commanded Hooker's I and IX Corps, the latter corps now commanded by Reno. The Center Wing, under Maj. Gen. Edwin Vose Sumner, comprised Sumner's II Corps and Mansfield's XII Corps. The Left Wing, commanded by Maj. Gen. William B. Franklin, consisted of his own VI Corps and Maj. Gen. Darius N. Couch's division of the IV Corps.

Back in friendly territory, McClellan had issued orders prohibiting pillaging, yet the AoP soon found better opportunities to supplement their rations than were available in Northern Virginia, and there were several violations of McClellan's order. Senior officers in the AoP worked to follow the order. As a result, after being assigned to IX Corps, the 23rd Ohio had a run-in with their corps commander.

On Sunday evening, September 7, the regiment went into bivouac after a long day of moving through the AoP's staging areas in the heat. Exhausted, the men had begun gathering straw for bedding from a nearby farm when Reno rode up. Seeing the men expropriating the straw, he flew into a rage and vehemently scolded them demanding to speak to their commander. When Hayes stepped forward to defend his men's conduct, Reno told him in no uncertain terms that taking property from residents of a loyal state would not be tolerated. Not backing down, Hayes snidely responded, "Well, I trust our generals will exhibit the same energy in dealing with our foes that they do in the treatment of their friends." . (Note: Bailey and Rafuse differ on what ensued afterwards. Bailey writes that Reno let the comment slide and departed. Rafuse writes that Reno asked Hayes for an explanation of his statement. Hayes responded that he meant no disrespect, but the regiment's cheers as Reno rode away further angered him leading him to contemplate Hayes's arrest. Rafuse adds that later, to Hayes' relief, Cox, Scammon, and the other Ohio colonels assured Hayes that his handling of Reno and his men's response were proper.) On Monday, September 8, the 23rd Ohio's division was ordered to take the advance. Enjoying the nice weather and rich farmland, the 23d Regiment was in a good mood, giving facetious answers to what troops they were on the march to Brookville. From there they led on to Goshen, then Ridgeville, where it met the B&O, moving west arriving at Frederick, shortly after noon, Friday, September 12. Hayes later wrote in his diary that, in contrast to the rugged mountains of their former location, they marched through a "well-cultivated, beautiful region," with the heat and dust moderated by occasional rain.

Late in the afternoon of Friday, September 12, IX Corps neared Frederick. The 23rd Ohio and its division were leading the advance and made contact with the Confederate rear-guard of cavalry under Hampton at the Monocacy River 3 miles (4.8 km) east of Frederick and drove them back into the town. Cox deployed his division in line of battle once across the river on both sides of the National Pike. The 23rd Ohio, in Scammon's brigade on the south side of the macadamized road, advanced west with its division, driving Maj. Gen. D. H. Hill's forces west out of the city with slight loss on both sides.

The 23rd Ohio and other members of the Kanawha found that Frederick was a stronghold of unionists, and as Hampton's cavalry (Hill's rearguard) departed, "while the carbine smoke and the smell of powder still lingered," the local citizens warmly received them giving the column fruits and refreshments. Hayes wrote to his wife of the joy of the residents at their arrival after four days of occupation by the Confederates, and a local resident later wrote, "a regiment of Ohio volunteers makes its appearance and is hailed with most enthusiastic demonstrations of joy. Handkerchiefs are waved, flags are thrown from Union houses, and a new life appears infused into the people." Hayes and his men did not get to tarry in Frederick, as McClellan continued to push his people forward, and the 23rd Ohio encamped Friday night just beyond the western edge of the town.

About noon on Saturday, September 13, Cox was ordered to march 6 miles (9.7 km) northwest to Middletown, on the National Road leading to Hagerstown. {receded by a cavalry division, the Kanawha division marched over Catoctin Mountain into its valley reaching Middletown midafternoon and pushed through. Again, the men were warmly greeted by the locals. The IX Corps was now 4 miles (6.4 km) from Turner's and Fox's Gap. town Valley. Cox's men went camp on the western side of the village.

Meanwhile, Lee learned during late Saturday afternoon, that McClellan was moving far faster than anticipated. The Confederates, with more than half of their army at Harpers Ferry, a two-day march of 15 miles (24 km), and with the remainder divided into two parts, 13 miles (21 km), from each other, were very vulnerable to defeat in detail. To remedy this, Lee told Hill to ensure the gaps in the mountains were held long enough for him to concentrate his forces at Sharpsburg.

==== Fox's Gap ====
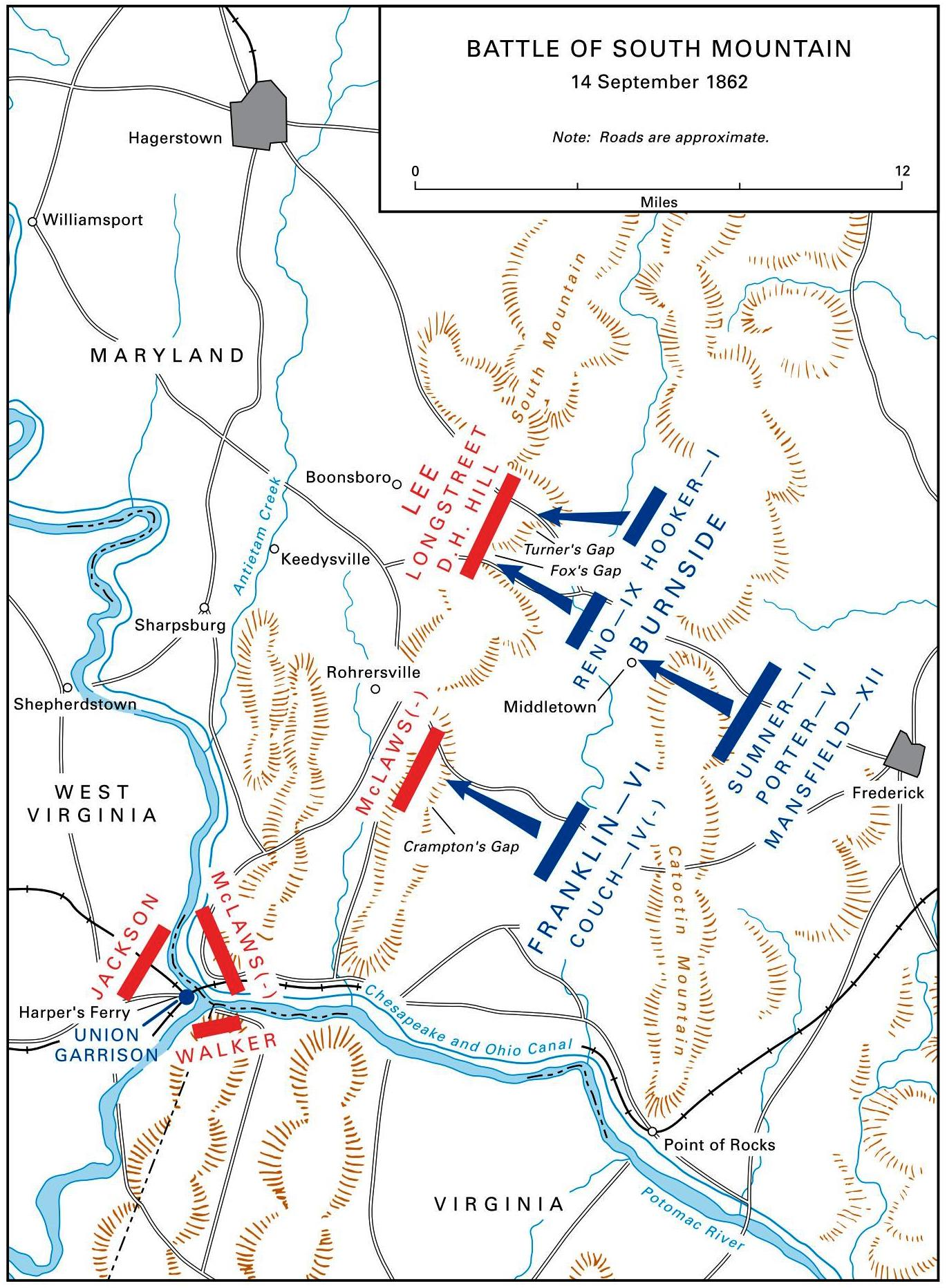
Maryland Campaign: Battle of South Mountain, September 14, 1862

On Sunday, arranged his three wings for the attacks on the passes at South Mountain. Burnside' Right Wing was tasked with Turner's Gap in the north. Franklin's Left Wing was assigned to Crampton's Gap in the south. McClellan kept Sumner's Center Wing in reserve.

Elements of Hill's division, primarily Garland's North Carolinians, (Note: The brigade was the 5th, 12th, 13th, 20th, and 23rd North Carolina Infantry regiments.) reinforced by a regiment from Drayton's Brigade, Jones' Division, Longstreet's Right Wing, and the 5th Virginia Cavalry under Rosser were sent by Hill to defend Fox's Gap. As part of Hill's task of defending two northern gaps, as some of Lee's wagon train still had not gotten through, (Note: The wagon trains and parks of artillery of the Army of Northern Virginia had been kept at Boonesboro, just on the west side of South Mountain, and had only begun heading to Sharpsburg, late Saturday.) he was also told to watch roads toward Harpers Ferry (then under siege by Jackson) to intercept any relief effort from McClellan.

The National Road, as it went north-westward, passed through Turner's Gap, a depression in South Mountain's crest. The Old Sharpsburg Road left the turnpike a little west of Middletown to the left, and crossed the mountain at Fox's Gap, about 1 mile (1.6 km) south of Turner's. The mountain crests were 1,300 feet (400 m) above Middletown with the two gaps 200–300 feet (61–91 m) feet lower than the summits near them. These summits, scattered and somewhat irregular hills upon the high rounded surface of the mountaintop, were wooded, but along the open south-easterly slopes, quite near the top, there were small farms with meadows and cultivated fields. The Federals would have to climb up the mainly open mountainside in view of the enemy, crossing across stonewalls and fields before entering the woods at the crest to drive the Rebels off allowing the AoP to surge through and strike Lee before he could concentrate his army. Reno would direct Cox to send one of the Kanawha Division's brigades to support a cavalry reconnaissance by Brig. Gen. Pleasonton's cavalry at Turner's Gap in the morning. Cox would send Scammon's 1st Brigade with the 23rd Ohio.

The 350 men in the 23rd Ohio were ordered to arms early on Sunday, September 14, and at 6:00 am were leading Scammon's 1500-man brigade west from Middletown. The first infantry regiment in the column, Hayes and his men marched west up National Road accompanied by Cox. After 1 mile (1.6 km), Cox was surprised to meet the 28th Ohio's Col. Augustus Moor who had been captured in a skirmish in Frederick on Friday. Paroled at daylight and heading for Frederick, when Moor heard they were bound for Turner's Gap, he blurted, "My God! Be careful," then, caught himself and said, "But I am paroled!" riding on lest he violate his parole. Cox galloped back up to Scammon and Hayes at the head of his column telling them he would follow him in close support with Crook's 2nd Brigade. As he rode back down along the column, warned each regimental commander to be prepared for anything, from a skirmish to a battle. After getting Crook on the road, Cox sent word to Reno that he might meet strong resistance on the mountain and should go forward with both brigades instead of just one. Meanwhile, the 23rd Ohio had met Brig. Gen. Pleasonton, the cavalry commander, whose scouts reported he Rebels strongly posted in Turner's Gap. At 7:00 am, Pleasonton had Scammon turn left off the National Pike at its crossing of Bolivar Branch Creek, south onto the Old Sharpsburg Road which crossed the mountain at Fox's Gap. When Cox returned, he was briefed by Pleasonton at the turn off for Old Sharpsburg Road. Pleasonton planned to let his cavalry demonstrate on the main road, supporting artillery that would fire on the Rebels, while Scammon marched up the Sharpsburg road to flank the force on the summit. Telling him of his suspicions of the enemy, Cox agreed and also told him that he had Crook coming forward too, and if it became necessary to fight with the whole division, he would assume the responsibility as his senior officer for bringing on an engagement.

Scammon's brigade continued its climb, halted several times to close ranks, with the 23rd Ohio in the lead. At 7:30 am, Crook's brigade filed off the turnpike onto Old Sharpsburg Road following Scammon's path. Cox's two brigades had fully 2 miles (3.2 km) up the steep road to go before reaching their jump-off point. On the way up, a courier returned from Reno with approval of Cox' action, and the assurance that the rest of IX Corps would come forward to support. It was not long before the climbing 23rd Ohio began to see little whiffs of white smoke in the edge of the woods followed by hum of bullets high over their heads, closely followed by the reports of muskets. The men realized that they were approaching the enemy's skirmish lines, and as they drew still nearer and began to advance in line of battle over increasingly rougher groundmarked by stumps, boulders, fences, trees, ravines and knolls. As the mountain-side became steeper, the musketry became a steady roll while the bursting shells and passing solid shot shrieked and hissed.

Cox had massed his divisional artillery, on a knoll in front of the turn off at Bolivar Branch, and his 23 guns began dueling with a Rebel battery well up toward Turner's Gap at 8:00 am. Hill instructed Garland to sweep through the woods, reach the Old Sharpsburg Road, and hold it all costs, as the safety of Lee's large train depended upon its being held. The 3,000 men of the Kanawha Division would advance on the 1,000 odd men of Garland's five regiment brigade. Garland's planned line would run from Old Sharpsburg Road up the hill, along a ridge road that ran along the crest of the mountain, up to the edge of the woods. Rosser's cavalry would be further up the hill on his right.

At about .5 miles (800 m) from the summit on the road to Fox's Gap, the Pelham's horse artillery, supported by Rosser's 5th Virginia Cavalry, had opened upon Scammon from the edge of the timber above the open fields, and Scammon had judiciously turned off upon an unfrequented road leading up the mountain just south of the main road, leading still farther to the left and nearly parallel to the ridge above. Here, Cox overtook him, his brigade being formed in line, under cover of the timber, facing open pasture fields, having a stone-wall along the upper side, with the forest again beyond this. Cox, instead of pushing directly into the gap, had Scammon advance further along a small road, screened by woods, to get around the Rebels' southern flank. The 23rd Ohio was sent to advance for a flank attack on the Rebel left by an unfrequented road leading up the mountain just south of the main road, followed the 12th and 30th Ohio. Although the 23rd Ohio's column moving up the road to the left was screened by trees, Hayes deployed Capt James P. McGrath's Company A as skirmishers to his right front in the woods, but receiving word that the Rebels were nearby, he also pushed Capt. Israel Canby's Company F out as left flank and Capt. Selleck B. Warren's Company I as right flank guards.

Meanwhile, Garland's brigade reached the mountain crest from the other side and moved south along the ridge road that intersected Old Sharpsburg Road at the crest at the Wise family's farm in Fox's Gap. Garland directed McRae's 5th North Carolina, to turn left short of the intersection with the mountain road and deploy in line of battle along the ridge road up the hill behind a fence overlooking a cornfield about 150 yards east of the ridge road to the right of Old Sharpsburg Road. The 12th North Carolina, as its support, and the 23rd North Carolina were posted along the ridge road behind a low stone-wall between Old Sharpsburg Road and the 5th. The 20th and 13th North Carolina were not in contact with the other three but further down the ridge road with 150 yards between them. Garland had also split Captain Bondurant's Jeff Davis (Alabama) Artillery of two 3-inch Ordnance Rifles and two 12-pounder Howitzers, placing one section on the ridge road between the 12th and 23rd North Carolina and the other across the Old Sharpsburg Road, also on the ridge road, between the 13th North Carolina and the main road.

As his men deployed, Garland sent scouts forward who soon spotted the 23rd Ohio's column moving behind the trees on his right front, outheast of the cornfield, and reported back. Realizing the 23rd Ohio was moving to higher ground from where they could turn his flank, Garland had McRae push forward 50 skirmishers of the 5th North Carolina who around 9:00 am made contact the 23rd Ohio's Company A who formed a line facing the cornfield. At the sound of contact, Garland ordered McRae to go over the fence into the cornfield and advance on the Federals. Meanwhile, Scammon had halted the 12th and 30th Ohio and was forming them into battle line facing the crest. Cox had returned, and Crook's brigade was behind him and soon began deploying for battle behind Scammon.

Through the trees and still atop his horse, Hayes was able to see the 5th North Carolina coming over the febce and toward him in the cornfield. He halted his column in the woods and formed it into line of battle facing the enemy. Once in position, he then ordered his men forward over the rough ground between them and the advancing Rebels in the cornfield The 23rd Ohio advanced in line, initially alone, with its skirmishers out front. Hayes' advance startled the inexperienced troops on the right of the 5th North Carolina's advancing line who quickly broke and forced McRae and the rest of the regiment to fall back to their original position behind the fence. Scammon saw the 23rd Ohio suddenly advancing out of the woods on his left and soon had White's 12th Ohio and Ewing's 30th Ohio hustling forward in support.

Posted behind the fence and stone walls, the 5th North Carolina soon poured a destructive fire of musketry, grape, and canister into the regiment at close range. They were soon joined by the 23rd North Carolina on their left, which had advanced about forty yards from the ridge road in front of the Wise farm to counter White's, who had by then come up. The volume of fire soon stopped Hayes' advance in the cornfield 100 yards (91 m) from the Confederates. Hayes, who had dismounted for the passage through the corn, ordered a charge.

Very quickly, Hayes and several command elements were badly wounded (Hayes's arm broken), and over 100 dead and wounded lay on the mountain slope including his Serggeant Major. Struck in the left arm just above his elbow, Hayes refused to leave the field but tried to carry on. When the enemy, probably Rosser's dismounted cavalrymen, suddenly opened fire from the left, Hayes ordered Capt. James L. Drake's Company H, his left flank company, to refuse the line to counter the new threat, however to his dismay, his whole regiment began falling back to the woods leaving him lying in no-man's land. When the men realized they had left him, a party came back that attracted heavy fire such that Hayes told them to fall back. A second attempt 20 minutes later was successful and brought him back behind the regiment now in the woods. After arguing with his staff, Hayes relented and departed to have his wound dressed, officially passing command to Maj. Comly.

Colmly quickly refused the regiment's left to defend against the Rebels there. While not breaking the Rebel line, Scammon's brigade had battered it. Elements of Crook's brigade had extended Scammon's left and right flanks. Cox had Crook send Col. Ogden Street's 11th Ohio up the hill on Colmly's left, but they were repulsed. Lt. Col. Gottfried Becker's 28th Ohio entered the line to the right of the 30th Ohio. Scammon had the 11th, 12th, and 23rd make a coordinated charge up the hill. Garland's brigade managed one volley before the three regiments were on them and over the fence and walls, dislodging the enemy and driving them into the woods beyond leaving a large number of their men killed by bayonet. The 11th Ohio drove Rosser's cavalry and a battery from the left. The 23rd Ohio and the 12th sent the 5th, 12th, 23rd and 20th North Carolina reeling back.

Elements of Crook's brigade had extended Scammon's right flank as well; Ewing's 30th Ohio now had Lt. Col. Gottfried Becker's 28th Ohio and Crook's own 36th Ohio on their right. The left cleared and center completely broken, these two regiments pushed the Confederate left. Garland was between them and the Wise farm on the crest with the 13th North Carolina's commander, Lt. Col. Ruffin. Ruffin was soon wounded in the hip and Garland was mortally wounded soon after. Garland soon died and the Ruffin quickly found out the rest of the brigade was gone and the Cox's division was just up the ridge road. Ruffin began a fighting retreat to a secondary position along the Old Sharpsburg Road and gathered the remnants of the brigade. The Kanawha Division still came on and in a bitter struggle once again drove the Rebels beyond Sharpsburg Road and up the slope of the crest toward the Mountain House at Turner's Gap. The 5th North Carolina, cut off, retreated southwest down the mountain toward Rohrersville. The Rebels' left flank conducted a fighting retreat until the arrival of Anderson's brigade.

Although Garland's line had been broken, the rallying and fighting had been stubborn for more than an honr. Cox's men were now positioned diagonally across the mountaintop with the right exposed to a severe artillery fire. The men of the 23rd Ohio and their comrades learned from their prisoners that they were up against Hill's five-brigade division, and that Longstreet was said to be in near support. The 23rd Ohio's and the division's losses had not been trifling, and Cox deemed it wise to contract his lines, so that he could hold the crest until the rest of IX Corps arrived. To protect his right, he pulled the 30th and 36th Ohio back to the crest into the woods on the south side of the gap, where he could still command the Sharpsburg road, and making the 30th Ohio his right flank, with the 28th and 36th Ohio in second line. His right in the woods now looked north into Wise's fields. His two brigades now used the stonewall along the crest road to anchor their positions.

By noon, the Rebels had drawn out of range of the 23rd Ohio and its brethren and the battle was reduced an artillery duel. At 2:00 pm, IX Corps elements began arriving with Willcox's division reporting to Cox. Reno soon brought the remainder of the corps up and renewed the battle for Fox's Gap during the afternoon. During the remainder of the day the regiment fought with its division. The Kanawha had pushed the Rebels back, the 23rd Ohio participating in three bayonet charges that day, and inflicted heavy losses but the men were exhausted. This pause allowed Confederate reinforcements under Hood to deploy in the gap around the Daniel Wise farm. Now the corps commander, Cox could not drive the defenders off the mountain. Hood also could not drive IX Corps from the crest road. Shortly after personally commending Scammon on his brigade's performance, Reno was mortally wounded and Cox moved up to command the corps. Scammon took over the Kanawha Division, and Ewing took command of the brigade. The 23rd Ohio and the Kanawha held their positions and repulsed Confederate attacks trying to close Fox's Gap. By nightfall, the Confederates were still on the mountain but had lost control of the gaps and therefore withdrew in the night giving the AoP claim to victory.

Armstrong, in Major McKinley, notes that while the future president held one of the more desirable, safer assignments in the regiment, he would find himself in dangerous situations, such as delivering rations in West Virginia to detachments or in foraging parties. In heavy contact, such as at Fox's Gap, he had to deliver rations to the regiment on the battle line. The young man censored himself in his letters home, and later in a speech commemorating Hayes in 1893, but he was witness to the losses from the costly victory. The 23rd Ohio lost nearly 200 men killed, mortally wounded, or wounded with seven men missing at the post-battle muster while the men's symbolic identity, the regimental colors were quite tattered from Rebel artillery and musketry.

With Lee's withdrawal to Sharpsburg, if McClellan had moved quickly, he might have caught Lee's army before it could concentrate. (Note: The AoP's casualties were 2,325 (443 killed, 1,807 wounded, and 75 missing) of 28,000 engaged (roughly 8%); The ANV lost 2,685 (325 killed, 1560 wounded, and 800 missing) of 18,000 (roughly 15%).) The 23rd Ohio, and the rest of the army, were buoyed by the victory where they ended "the tide of Rebel successes," Lee considered ending his invasion. However, McClellan's limited activity on Monday, September 15, doomed the U.S. garrison at Harpers Ferry, and gave Lee time to unite the rest of his army at Sharpsburg before the upcoming battle on Tuesday.

==== Antietam ====
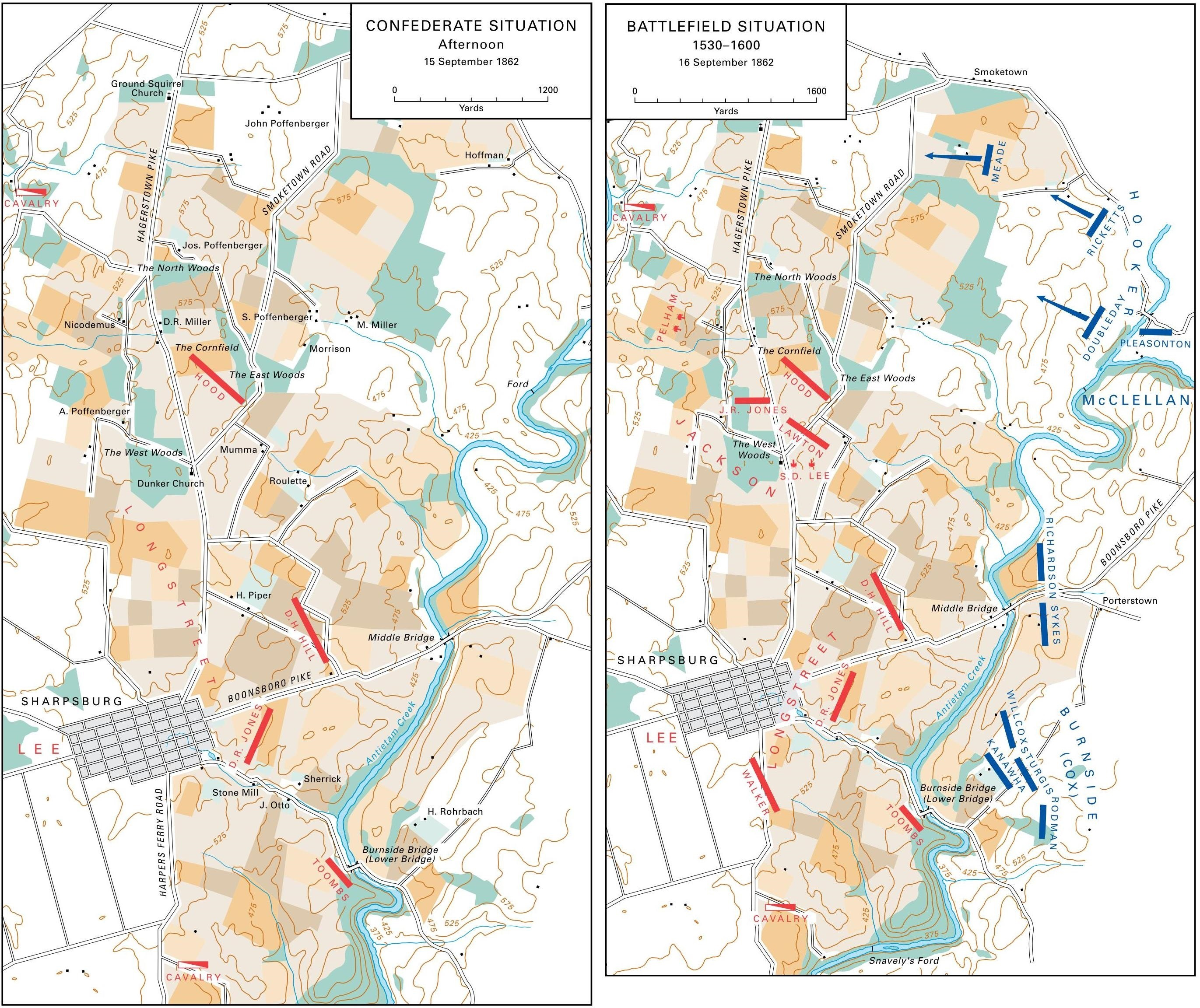
Battlefield of Antietam, situation September 15 to 16, 1862

On Monday, the 23rd Ohio woke up to a new chain of command as a result Sunday's casualties. The Kanawha's commander was the new commander of IX Corps. (Note: Midafternoon on Sunday as the remainder of IX Corps went into line to relieve the Kanawha, Reno had stopped directly in front of his troops as he reconnoitered the enemy's forces advancing up the road at Fox's Gap. He was shot in the chest by a raw recruit soldier from the 35th Massachusetts who mistook him for Confederate cavalry at dusk. Of note, Ezra A. Carman wrote Reno was kileed by John Bell Hood's men who fired from the woods that 35th Massachusetts skirmishers had just retreated from. Furher, in his official report, Daniel Harvey Hill credited the 23rd North Carolina. This elevated Cox to command the IX Corps.) This had a ripple effect down the chain with Col. Scammon moving up to command the Kanawha Division. His replacement to command the 1st Brigade was Col. Ewing from the 30th Ohio. As a result of Hayes' wounds, Maj. Comly remained in command of the regiment.

On Monday, Lee deployed his troops behind Antietam Creek along a low ridge in an effective defensive, yet not impregnable, position with excellent cover for infantrymen, with rail and stone fences, outcroppings of limestone, little hollows and swales. Antietam Creek between them and the AoP was only a minor barrier, 60–100 feet (18–30 m) wide, fordable in places, and crossed by three stone bridges each 1 mile (1.6 km) apart. The AVN's rear was blocked by the Potomac and only a single crossing point, Boteler's Ford at Shepherdstown, was available if it needed to retreat. (Note: The ford at Williamsport, Maryland, 10 miles (16 km) to the northwest, used by Jackson in his march to Harpers Ferry, blocked by the disposition of Union forces during the battle ruled out retreat in that direction.) At Sharpsburg on Monday, Lee had a force of only 18,000 men, only a third the size of the AoP.

With the rest of IX Corps, the 23rd spent Monday morning recuperating from the battle, and during the afternoon, marched west off the mountain towards Sharpsburg and eventually went into bivouac east of Antietam Creek with the rest of the AoP as the Rebels continued to concentrate across the creek from them in the town. Historians have written that an immediate AoP attack on Tuesday morning, September 16, would have had an overwhelming advantage in numbers, but due to his trademark caution and mistaken belief that he faced as many as 100,000 men, McClellan delayed his attack for a day. Ergo, Lee had more time to prepare defensive positions and to gather Longstreet's corps from Hagerstown and Jackson's corps, minus A.P. Hill's division, from Harpers Ferry. Jackson took up the left (northern) flank and Longstreet the right (southern) flank on the 4 miles (6.4 km) Rebel line.

Tuesday evening, McClellan sent Hooker's I Corps across Antietam to probe the enemy positions. Meade's division cautiously attacked Hood's troops near the East Woods. After darkness fell, artillery fire continued as McClellan arranged the AoP for the next day. At 9:00 p.m., it started raining. His plan was to overwhelm the enemy's left flank due to the configuration of bridges over the Antietam. The lower bridge, Burnside Bridge, was dominated by the occupied bluffs overlooking it, the middle bridge on the Boonsboro road in Rebel artillery field of fire from the heights near Sharpsburg, but the upper bridge was 2 miles (3.2 km) east of the Confederate guns safe to cross. McClellan planned to launch more than half the AoP in assault, starting with two corps, supported by a third, and if necessary a fourth. He planned a simultaneous diversionary attack on the Confederate right with a fifth corps, and prepared an attack on Lee's center with his reserves if either attack succeeded. The skirmish in the East Woods gave away McClellan's plan, and Lee shifted men to the left flank and sent urgent messages to his two commanders who had not yet arrived on the battlefield: Lafayette McLaws with two divisions and A.P. Hill with one division.

McClellan's planning and execution were poor as he issued each of his subordinate commanders only the orders for his own corps and did not let them know his entire battle plan. The battlefield terrain made is subordinates' ability to monitor events outside of their sectors difficult. Additionally, McClellan's headquarters were more than a mile in the rear degrading his control of separate corps. This lack of coordination and concentration almost completely nullified the AoP's numerical advantage the Union enjoyed and let Lee shift his troops to meet each offensive.

The 23rd Ohio and the Kanawha moved forward with the rest of Burnside's wing and by the time of Meade's probe late Tuesday afternoon, the Kanawha was positioned in the font of the AoP's left facing the Longstreet's Corps across Antietam Creek. On Wednesday morning, on September 17, the fighting began at dawn (about 5:30 a.m.) with Hooker's I Corps attack down the Hagerstown Turnpike Fighting was heavy with a series of counterattacks on the Rebel left through the morning.

As the combat continued through the morning on the AoP's right and center, the Kanawha Division was split and Ewing's brigade with the 23rd Ohio was made the 3rd brigade of Rodman's 3rd Division, IX Corps. (Note: The other two brigades consisted of New York and New England regiments. Crook's brigade was attached to Sturgis's 2nd Division)

Facing them was a Rebel right thinned by Lee's movement of units to his left flank. The two divisions at dawn, David R. Jones' and John G. Walker's, had been reduced to Jones' less George T. Anderson's Georgia brigade by 10 a.m. Four thin brigades guarded the ridges near the town primarily on Cemetery Hill. The remaining 400 men of the 2nd and 20th Georgia Infantry and two artillery batteries, under Toombs defended Rohrbach's Bridge, the stone three-span, 125 feet (38 m) structure that would become known to history as "Burnside's Bridge" because of the notoriety of the coming battle' The main road leading to it was exposed to enemy fire, but a farm lane allowed a more protected approach to around 250 yards (230 m) from the bridge. The Rebel position on a steep nearly 100 feet (30 m)rise dominated it with trees and an old quarry and stonewall provided cover for defenders. The Confederates also strengthened their position with breastworks made from logs and fence rails.

Despite the fact that the creek could have been forded "at a variety of places out of enemy range," Burnside concentrated his plan instead on storming the bridge while simultaneously crossing a ford .5 miles (0.80 km) downstream. While Crook prepared to lead Sturgis's attack on the bridge, the 23rd Ohio's brigade in Rodman's division advanced south toward a ford of the Antietam downstream from Burnside Bridge. Once across, the brigade would be in position to support the 3rd Division when it crossed the Antietam over the bridge from the high ground toward the Harpers Ferry Road south of the town.

When Rodman's men reached the first ford, they found the banks too high to negotiate and struggled through thick brush trying to locate Snavely's Ford, a ford recommended by some local farmers, 2 miles (3.2 km) downstream, intending to flank the Confederates. Meanwhile, Crook's assault was led by skirmishers from the 11th Connecticut, who after receiving punishing fire for 15 minutes, withdrew losing one-third of their strength. Crook's main effort failed when his unfamiliarity with the terrain brought his brigade into full view of the dug-n Rebels, .25 miles (0.40 km) upstream from the bridge, where they exchanged volleys with Confederate skirmishers for the next few hours.

While the 23rd Ohio and its division were struggling toward Snavely's Ford, Burnside and Cox directed a second assault by Sturgis's 1st Brigade under Nagle which also suffered galling Confederate musketry and artillery until its attack fell apart. By noon, McClellan, losing patience, had sent multiple couriers to Burnside urging him forward. Burnside indignantly told the last, "McClellan appears to think I am not trying my best to carry this bridge; you are the third or fourth one who has been to me this morning with similar orders."

Sturgis' 2nd Brigade, under Edward Ferrero, made a third attempt on the bridge at 12:30 p.m. closing to within 25 yards (23 m) of the Confederates. At that time, the 23rd Ohio and its division had reached Snavely's Ford and begun crossing. A half hour later, at 1:00 p.m., Toombs' ammunition was running low and word reached him that the Rodman was across the creek on his right flank so he withdrew to the heights having traded fewer than 160 casualties for 500 AoP casualties and they stalled Burnside for more than three hours. (Note: Cox later wrote, "The lulls in the fighting had been short, and only to prepare new efforts. The severity of the work was attested by our losses, which, before the crossing was won, exceeded five hundred men and included some of our best officers, such as Colonel Kingsbury, of the 11th Connecticut; Lieutenant-Colonel Bell, of the 51st Pennsylvania, and Lieutenant-Colonel Coleman, of the 11th Ohio, two of them commanding regiments.)

As Burnside moved his forces across the river and positioned them for a further advance on Sharpsburg, Ewing's brigade and the rest of Rodman's division had moved to unite with the rest of IX Corps near the bridge. Burnside, Cox, and the division commanders recognized that their first task was to prepare to hold the recently taken high ground gained against counterattack and to counter the artillery from Cemetery Hill firing on them. Cox had his corps light batteries brought over and distributed in the line. The infantrymen were made to lie down behind the crest to save them from the concentrated artillery fire that had reopened once Toombs regiments succeeded in reaching their main line..

Despite the fact that Burnside's operations were supposed to be a diversion to support the attacks by the AoP's right, McClellan was anxious about an overwhelming attack upon his right, despite the fact that he had captured the critical high ground in the center and was filling it with artillery. His worries caused him to press Burnside and his corps commanders to advance, and sent orders accordingly. The left wing's heavy combat had depleted of Sturgis' 2nd Division's (and Crook's brigade's) ammunition and the men were too exhausted to advance and needed resupply quickly. that they should be freshly supplied before entering into another engagement. Cox asked Burnside to send Willcox's 1st Division, IX Corps over, with an ammunition train, and that Sturgis's 2nd Division be relieved by them, remaining, however, on the west side of the stream as support to the others.

The men of the 23rd Ohio had risen at 2:00 a.m. and moved forward towards the creek without eating breakfast and carrying no rations. The corps supply train had not come forward before IX Corps made contact. Twelve hours later, as the men of the 23rd Ohio shelterd from artillery and musketry by lying down on the slope, word came that the corps' supply train had arrived. McKinley, now also Ewing's acting commissary officer, decided to use the opportunity to feed the hungry regiment. Acting on his own initiative, young McKinley rode back 2 miles (3.2 km) collecting an ad hoc force from the brigade's stragglers to the train. Once there he and his team loaded a wagon with cooked meat, pork and beans, hard tack, and ground coffee. Asking for a volunteer, he was joined by John Harvey of the 23rd Ohio's Company I. With a full wagon, McKinley and Harvey made haste for the regiment and its brigade-mates just on the other side of Snavely's Ford. Using woods and staying behind hills, they had traveled to a rise in their path where they could see the regiment, but the remaining road was in full view and range of the Confederate musketry and artillery. Ignoring warnings from several staff officers along the way that enemy fire would prevent their reaching the regiment, McKinley and Harvey made a run for it, and disregarding a cannonball striking the rear of the wagon, the duo made it across the ford.

After crossing the creek and reporting to Comly, McKinley distributed rations in groups of ten who came down to the wagon from the slope to the cheers of the regiment. Comly would later tell Hayes, who already thought well of the young man, of McKinley's actions and wrote, "No promotion could be made which would give more general satisfaction." On September 24, a week later, the state commissioned McKinley a second lieutenant in Company D. (Note: In 1896, some of McKinley's comrades lobbied for him to be belatedly awarded the Medal of Honor for his bravery that day; Lieutenant General Nelson A. Miles was inclined to grant McKinley the award, but when the then-President-elect heard about the effort, he declined it.) Company C's 1st Lieut. James L. Botsford, detailed as an aide-de-camp to Scammon, later wrote:

It was nearly dark when we heard tremendous cheering from the left of our regiment. As we had been having heavy fighting up to this time, our division commander, General Scammon, sent me to find out the cause. I very soon learned that the cheering was for McKinley and his hot cofTee. You can readily imagine the rousing welcome he received from both officers and men. When you consider the fact of his leaving his post of security and driving into the midst of a bloody battle with a team of mules, who commanded the brigade, and at Antietam, the division it needs no words of mine to show the character and determination of McKinley, a boy not twenty years of age. McKinley loaded two wagons with supplies, but the mules of one wagon were disabled. He was ordered back again and again, but he pushed right on.

While McKinley was doling out the food to his comrades, the swapping of Willcox for Sturgis was done as rapidly as practicable, hampered by the fact that all the wagons had to pass down the steep hill road and through the narrow defile of the bridge. Still, it was 3:00 p.m. before these changes and further preparations could be made. Burnside had personally gone down to the bridge to clear out the bottleneck and gone over to the west bank to consult with Cox and his division commanders despite being under constant artillery and musketry a scant 1,200 yards (1,100 m) distant along the Harper's Ferry Ridge Road. Eventually, he got his forces fed, replenished, and moving up the slope to Sharpsburg. Cox's corps advanced in a line of Rodman's 3rd Division on the left and Willcox's 1st on the right. Sturgis' 2nd Division would be the reserve and waited in cover by the creek replenishing its stores.

Once fed, the 23rd Ohio was ordered with the rest of Ewing's brigade, to advance. Although the two brigades of the Kanawha Division were separated, they both functioned as an immediate reserve behind the two attacking divisions. As Burnside arrayed his troops, the resupply continued. Cox had Willcox's 1st Division on the right and Rodman's 3rd Division on the left.

Lee had used the Burnside's delay from crossing to continuing his advance to bolster his right flank. He sent every available artillery unit to his right, although making no attempt to strengthen D.R. Jones's badly outnumbered infantry. Instead, he counted on the arrival of A. P. Hill's Light Division, currently inbound on a taxing 17 metres (0.017 km) march from Harpers Ferry. By 2:00 p.m., Hill had reached Boteler's Ford (Lee's only escape route across the Potomac) and was able to confer with Lee at 2:30 p.m., who ordered him to bring up his men to the right of Jones.

Unaware that 3,000 new men were rapidly approaching Rodman's left flank, Burnside planned to move around the weakened Confederate right flank, converge on Sharpsburg, and cut Lee's army off from Boteler's Ford. At 3:00 p.m., Burnside had Cox advance west with 8,000 troops in Rodman's, Willcox's, and the Kanawha divisions (most of them fresh) and 22 guns for close support. Sturgis' 2nd Division remained in reserve on the west bank of the Antietam.

An initial assault led by the 79th New York "Cameron Highlanders" succeeded against Jones's outnumbered division, which was pushed back past Cemetery Hill and to within 200 yards (180 m) of Sharpsburg. Farther to the Union left, Rodman's division advanced toward Harpers Ferry Road. . Its lead brigade, under Colonel Harrison Fairchild, came under heavy shellfire from a dozen enemy guns to their front but kept pushing forward. The streets of Sharpsburg were clogged with retreating Confederates. Of the five brigades in Jones's division, only Toombs's brigade was still intact, but he had only 700 men.

A. P. Hill's division arrived at 3:30 p.m. Hill divided his column, with two brigades moving southeast to guard his flank and the other three, about 2,000 men, moving to the right of Toombs's brigade and preparing for a counterattack. At 3:40 p.m., Gregg's South Carolina brigade, supportedon the left by Branch's North Carolina and Archer's Tennessee brides on the left, hit the 16th Connecticut in Harland's 2nd Brigade on Rodman's left flank in the forty-acre cornfield of farmer John Otto. The Connecticut men were some of the many raw recruits in the AoP and had been in service for only three weeks, and their line disintegrated with 185 casualties. The 4th Rhode Island on their right amid the high stalks of corn, were disoriented and surprised by Confederates were wearing Union uniforms captured at Harpers Ferry and carrying flags that looked very similar to the national colors. Lest they fire on friendly troops, they held their fire when they saw Gregg's Rebels who in turn let loose uncontested musketry until the 43th Rhode Island realizing their tragic error also broke and ran. The 8th Connecticut, far out in advance and isolated, were enveloped and driven down the hills toward Antietam Creek.

Hill pushed his division forward and formed them in a line along the Harper's Ferry Road with an eye to attack east toward Antietam Creek. Meanwhile, Ewing, having heard of Rebels appearing on the front left - Gregg's men, ordered Comly and Jones to take the 23rd and 30th Ohio forward at the double-quick to stop them. Unfortunately, arriving too late to prevent the rout of Harland's 2nd Brigade, they were still able to push west under heavy fire into Otto's cornfield, the 23rd Ohio on the right and the 30th on the left, to reach a stone wall, with Jones's men passing through the northern section of the cornfield. At the stone wall, the 23rd and 30th Ohio opened fire on Archer's Tennessee brigade advancing toward them over a plowed field in their front. and nearly brought the Confederate advance to a halt. According to Burnside's official report, "by a brilliant change of front he saved the left from being completely driven in."

Comly and the 23rd Ohio then saw friendly troops moving up from the south toward the 30th Ohio's position, and assumed, like the ill-fated 4th Rhode Island, that these men were friendly troops, the 12th Ohio, who were tasked to cover the Ewing's left. The 12th Ohio, however, had been stopped by artillery and musketry from these troops. Once again, men of IX Corps were again fooled by Rebels wearing Yankee uniforms as Gregg's command, still in the cornfield just south of Jones's position, opened "a withering fire ... upon us from our left flank from which we suffered most severely." Among the effects of this fire was the regimental colors being instantly shot down and the 29-year-old Color Sergeant Joshua A Armstrong being killed. (Note: Per Rafuse in 2011, "Few regimental color bearers, like this young man with the national flag of the Twenty-third Ohio Volunteer Infantry, survived the war without serious injury or death. An officer once told color bearer Joshua Armstrong that the duty was far too hazardous. "No one can carry it and live," the officer asserted. "Then I'll carry it and die," Armstrong replied haughtily. His prediction unfortunately came true when he was killed at Antietam.")

Ewing had Comly to pull back and change the 23rd Ohio front to the south and told Jones to pull back on the 23rd Ohio's left, but only four of the 30th Ohio's companies heard his orders, and the other six stayed at the wall suffering a galling flank fire. Meanwhile, Toombs' brigade moved forward on the section of the wall the 23rd Ohio was still pulling back from, and the companies of the two regiments there soon broke under Confederate attacks. A battery on the rise by the bridge fired on the advancing Rebels and inadvertently caused casualties to the retreating Ohio men. The Ohioans began falling back to rally on high ground east of the cornfield where Cox had moved up Sturgis's division.

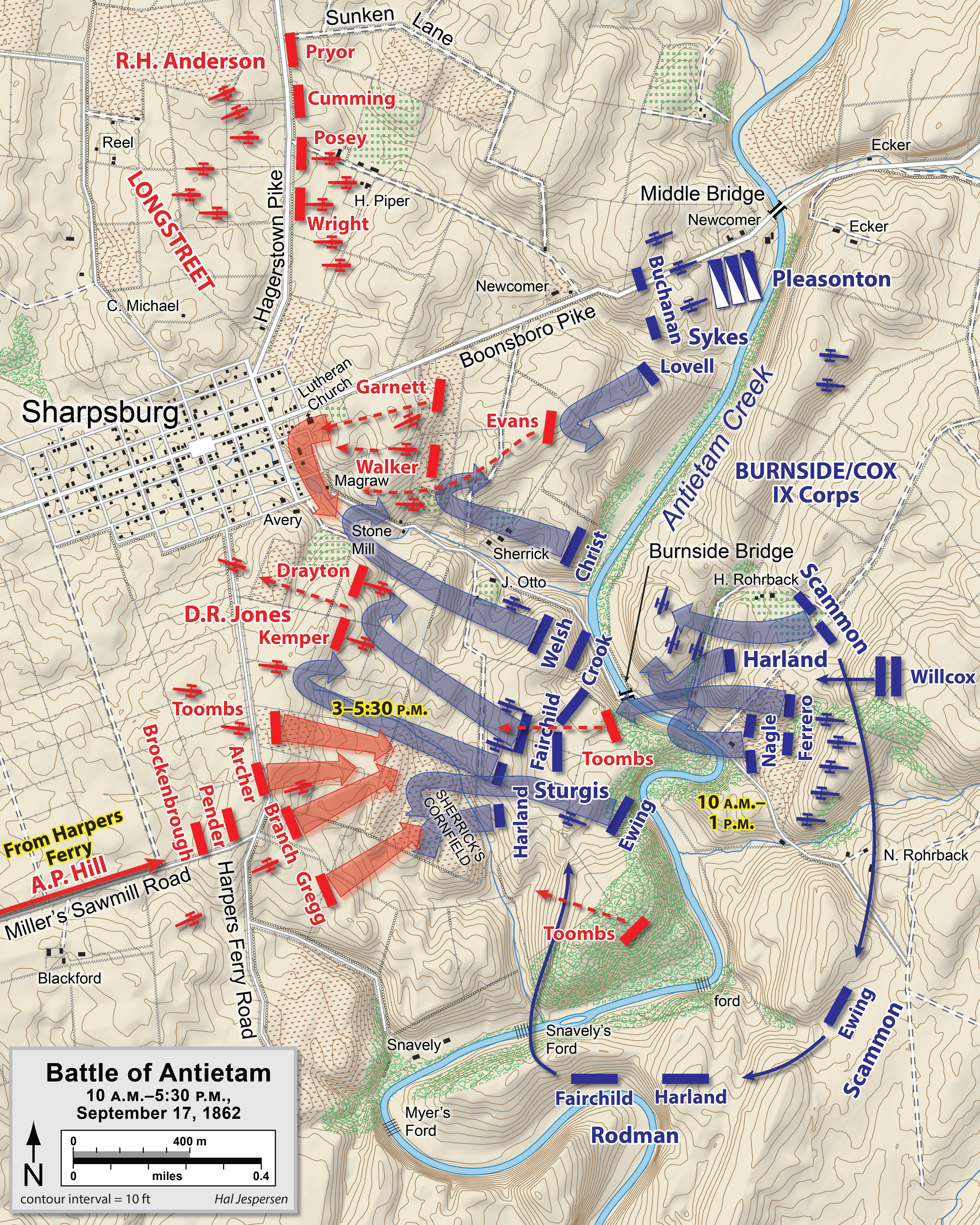
Assaults by Burnside's IX Corps, 10 a.m. to 4:30 p.m.

As Ewing's brigade fell back with the remnants of Rodman's 3rd Division, Col. Jones, the 30th Ohio's commander, was captured, and from the south Archer's men appeared. After a moment's delay Major Comly placed the colors on a new line facing Archer's brigade and at a right angle to the former front, and, without any further order, the 23rd Ohio, at a run, formed in the new direction and poured volleys into the Confederates checking their advance. The remainder of the brigade withdrew; but, through some error, no order reached Comly and his men, and the 23rd Ohio remained on the field until Col. Scammon came back and ordered it to the rear. The regiment joined the rest of IX Corps on the high ground overlooking Antietam Creek. This effectively ended the bloody Battle of Antietam and added another 69 further names to the 23rd Ohio's casualty list.

Suffering casualties of about 20 percent, IX Corps was still twice the size of Hill's Confederates, but an unnerved Burnside withdrew Cox back to the west bank of the Antietam. He subsequently asked McClellan for more men and guns yet the army commander sent just one battery saying, "I can do nothing more. I have no infantry," despite having V and VI Corps fresh and in reserve. Concerned that he was greatly outnumbered and that a massive counterstrike by Lee was imminent, McClellan instead concentrated his artillery on the high ground in his center. Burnside's men spent the rest of the day guarding the bridge.

The 23rd Ohio, meanwhile, almost exhausted by several days' hard fighting, was ordered to support a battery from Sturgis' division during the night. The regiment remained on the battlefield Friday night, and stayed by the batteries until relieved until Saturday afternoon. September 18. The men noted that the dead and dying strewn around the creek, although rapidly decomposing in the heat, were soon stripped of all items of value. The men also noted that McKinley's commissary work continued apace. On Sunday, the Kanawha Division moved back across Antietam Creek, near its mouth on the Potomac River, roughly 7 miles (11 km)downriver from Harpers Ferry.

The regiment's service in 1862's Maryland Campaign was the highlight of its first two years of service. The 23rd Ohio's losses at Antietam, although significant, were less than at South Mountain. The regiment lost eight dead, fifty-nine wounded, and two missing. The men had experienced their heaviest combat so far and were commended their performance . The 23rd Ohio's losses at South Mountain and Antietam opened up command positions in the regiment. Commissary Sgt. McKinley had impressed the command elements with his actions, and Comly recommended him for a promotion. He felt McKinley demonstrated ability and energy by keeping the regiment fully supplied with rations ready for eating, and having coolly delivered them under fire twice. (Note: Armstrong writes in 2000, "Thirty-four years later, some of McKinley's comrades sought a greater recognition for him: the Congressional Medal of Honor. Shortly after McKinley's election to the presidency, they appealed to President Grover Cleveland to award the medal, and Nelson Miles, the major general commanding the army, recommended the award, but when McKinley learned about it, he asked that no action be taken, and the matter was dropped. Two years after McKinley's death, the state of Ohio erected a thirty-three and a half foot monument near the Burnside Bridge on the Antietam battlefield to commemorate McKinley's "valiant act" during the battle.") On the Friday after the battle, September 24, McKinley's nomination for a commission as a 2nd Lieutenant in Company D was sent to Gov. Denison. The new officer and his line company, and the regiment as a whole, and with the exception of Sheridan's 1864 Shenandoah Valley Campaign, would never again play such a significant part on the war's big stage, and with the exception of Sheridan's 1864 Shenandoah Valley Campaign, it never again played on the war's big stage.

Remaining along the river for almost three weeks, the men witnessed several of Thaddeus Lowe's balloon ascensions. President Lincoln visited the AoP in early October, and on Friday, October 3, he reviewed the Kanawha Division by the Potomac. With Burnside and MacClellan, he rode past the regiments, but when coming to the 23rd Ohio, after a Burnside point and comment, Lincoln rode over to inspect the regimental national colors. The new color sergeant held out the bullet-riddled flag to Lincoln who seemed moved by Burnside's description of the unit's ordeals. McKinley, for his part, was impressed by Lincoln's facial expression, writing thirty plus years later "I remember, as though it were but yesterday, and thousands of my comrades will recall, how, when he reviewed the Army of the Potomac immediately after the battle of Antietam, his indescribably sad, thoughtful, far-seeing expression pierced every man's soul."

=== Return to Western Virginia ===
A few weeks later, on Wednesday, October 8, the 23rd Ohio's time with the AoP ended when Cox was told to take the Kanawha Division, which received the orders with intense dissatisfaction, back to western Virginia. The men who proudly noted the New York Herald's description of them as "the keen Damascus blade of the Army of the Potomac,"reluctantly set about preparing for the mopve. They were needed badly back in the Kanawha. The 5,000 men Cox had left under Col. Joseph A. J. Lightburn, were driven back to the Ohio River in the first two weeks of September by Confederate forces under Maj. Gen. William W. Loring. The Rebels who had been ordered to advance to relievea salt shortage in the Confederacy, had occupied Charleston, but with Lee south of the Potomac, the U.S. War department could better use the Kanawha Division to strengthen its forces in western Virginia and push the Rebels back. The six regiments of the Kanawha Division broke camp, about 9:00 am, gathered their gear and took up the line of march toward Hagerstown. The division under command of General Crook marched up the macadamized Sharpsburg Turnpike passing over the battlefield and through Sharpsburg and continuing north off the battlefield before continuing west on the National Road. Freshly dug graves lined the pike for miles, and the day was unusually excessively hot, considering the lateness of the season. The air was still and the limestone dust from the paving was suffocating. The dust was kept in constant motion by thousands of feet, and by the artillery and wagon-trains, and led to an almost unquenchable thirst. Due to considerable sickness while camped along the Potomac, the Kanawha men were not in the best condition for a fatiguing march, and all suffered from the hard pace and the stench from the battlefield. All these factors contributed to making Wednesday's march from the mouth of the Antietam to Hagerstown one of intense suffering. By noon, there were hundreds of soldiers in fence-corners, under trees, on logs or stones, all along the roadside, lying utterly exhausted, and completely broken down. Finally, about 5:00 pm, the column filed off to the right into some gently sloping fields, near Hagerstown, where arms were stacked, and campfires were lit.

On Thursday morning, reveille beat at an early hour, and, shortly after dawn, the column was again on the march, but with the lessons of Wednesday, General Crook ensured the march was conducted with great care and regularity. By early evening, October 9, the 23rd Ohio and its division encamped in or near a strip of woods on the National Road, and about 3 miles (4.8 km) west of Clear Springs.

==== Stuart's Chambersburg Raid ====
On Monday, October 6, Lee, now back in Virginia, had tasked Stuart with raiding Chambersburg, Pennsylvania. Stuart was to destroy the important railroad bridge over the Conococheague Creek, (Note: The railroad bridge was an important link in the movement of supplies to the Union Army at Hagerstown, Maryland.) bring back horses and capture government officials who might be exchanged for captured Confederate leaders or sympathizers.. (Note: Lee ordered Stuart to "...keep your movement secret, it will be necessary for you to arrest >11 citizens that may give information to the enemy, and should you meet with citizens of Pennsylvania holding State or Government offices, it will be desirable, if convenient, to bring them with you, that they may be used as hostages, or the means of exchanges, for our own citizens that have been carried off by the enemy.", and Stuart went even further, "As a measure of justice to our many good citizens who, without crime, have been taken from their homes and kept by the enemy in prison, all public functionaries, such as magistrates, postmasters, sheriffs, &c., will be seized as prisoners.") Lee also wanted "all information of the position, force and probable intention of the enemy."

On Friday morning, a small detachment of the 12th Illinois Cavalry had seen Stuart's raiding force cross the Potomac River and reported it back to the AoP command.

Stuart's force moved on toward Pennsylvania, seizing shoes and clothing and paying with Confederate scrip. By Friday dusk, at around 7:00 p.m., in a steady rain, the Confederates reached Chambersburg Town officials sent an alarm to Governor Andrew Curtin, who passed the message on to United States Secretary of War Edwin M. Stanton just before the Confederates cut the telegraph wires. The telegraph had an immediate effect with Halleck ordering McClellan to close all roads back to Virginia and to be sure none of the Confederates could return.

On Friday morning, October 10, to beat the heat, the column was moving at 3:00 am. Unbeknownst to the 23rd Ohio and the other six regiments of the Kanawha Division, they had narrowly missed intercepting the Rebel cavalry crossing the National Road 8 miles (13 km) from the Maryland-Pennsylvania state line and at 10:30 am, the column suddenly halted, and the men in the 23rd Ohio heard that Rebels were in the rear, had cut our wagon-train in two, captured most of it, and were working mischief. After the 28th Ohio was sent back, the men learned the entire supply train was safe and the rebels had not stopped but continued north.

The dust and the pace in the hot sun had made the three-day march one of the worst they experienced during the war. On Friday, October 10, the Kanawhan reached Hancock, and the men forded the Potomac to the Hancock, VA B&O station. There they entrained for Clarksburg, but before they left, they learned that they would be kept in the area to counter the Confederate cavalry. The next day, October 11, Stuart's men began their return movement along a different route to the east by way of Cashtown, Pennsylvania and into Maryland through Emmitsburg, Maryland on their way back to Virginia. This longer return route to the east and south allowed him to avoid any troops that might be waiting for his return along his original, more hilly, route, and enabled him to again completely circle McClellan's army.

On the morning of October 12, Stuart eluded the AoP and crossed the Potomacback into Loudoun County, Virginia by using White's Ford, which was 3 miles (4.8 km) below the mouth of the Monocacy River near present-day White's Ferry. Despite this, the confusion he had sown continued in Maryland and Pernnsylvania.

Meanwhile, at Hancock, on Saturday morning, October 11, the 23rd Ohio with the rest of the Ewing's 1st Brigade was sent after Stuart's raiders, and even though the men thought infantry pursuing cavalry was inane, they obeyed and marched about 20 miles (32 km) into Pennsylvania's Franklin County. Finding no enemy, the Kanawha returned to Hancock on Sunday, October 12, and again waded the Potomac into Virginia. But the "little chase into Pennsylvania," as McKinley called it, gave the soldiers a story they told for years, how on the march that day they had eaten breakfast in Pennsylvania, dinner in Maryland, and supper in Virginia.

==== Back to Clarksburg and then the Kanawha Valley ====
The division encamped that night on the south side of the Potomac River at the B&O station planning on transport from that point to Clarksburg. On Monday evening, the entire division left entrained once again and moved west, passing through Cumberland, MD, Grafton, and Parkersburg en route. The 23rd Ohio arrived at Clarksburg on October 15, Wednesday.

As the soldiers got off the train in Clarksburg, McKinley was give the men a higher quality of hardtack than had been available in Maryland, and fresh baked soft bread. Word of the Kanawha Division's impending return had caused Loring to retreat from Charlston to Lewisburg. Relieved for this action by the Confederate War Department, he was replaced by Brig. Gen. John Echols who immediately returned to Charleston. While the Kanawha got organized after its arrival, the U. S. command's plan was for the division to strike at or near Gauley Bridge while another U. S. force moved up from the Ohio. They would then either intercept the Echols' Rebels in retreat either up the Gauley toward Greenbrier, or by New River toward Raleigh and Princeton. However, the delay caused by Stuart's raid led to Echols recognizing the danger of being caught between the two advancing columns and leisurely pulling his command out of the Kanawha Valley, taking their plundered salt and other goods with them. (Note: The Confederacy and the wealthy elite would never control the Kanawha again. The historian, Scott A. MacKenzie, pointed out that a class struggle occurred in the valley through the war that radically changed its society and a new middle class emerged at the end of the war in the Kanawha in the new state of West Virginia. In 2015, he wrote that "... the social forces wrought by the internal civil war in Kanawha County changed its social structure. Before the war, poor whites and an enslaved population lived under the rule of the wealthy salt makers." When the new state government deposed the antebellum wealthy power brokers for supporting secession in 1861, a new group of leaders from the small middle class filled the void. The former elite's continuing armed rebellion made allies of the middle and lower classes which elevated many of the lower-class into this new growing middle class by 1865, an evolution that "... would have been unthinkable only four years before, but much had happened in that time." MacKenzie notes that the 23rd Ohio's Hayes observed that "Wealthy Kanawhans generally backed secession, but the poor followed a new Unionist middle class that insisted on law and order. Hayes erred in believing Kanawha to have a middle class before the war. Instead, the Kanawha Valley middle class was formed during the war. The [new] leadership formed a movement better suited to middle-class political and economic interests." MacKenzie further points out that while the "... war divided other parts of Appalachia and the South, but they did not change who ruled them. [Historians] have to account for the diversity in northwestern Virginia/West Virginia. No two places are the same. What may be true in Wheeling or Morgantown is not necessarily true in the Kanawha Valley. If new scholarship addresses these issues-long duration and diversity-then a more methodical and nuanced view of West Virginia's creation is possible. Moreover, its experiences can be better integrated into the historiography of Southern society in the Civil War era.")

At this point, there was a change of command and several promotions. Scammon was promoted to brigadier general and command of the brigade, and Hayes received promotion to colonel and assumed command of the regiment. Major Comly became the regiment's lieutenant colonel and was relieved as the regimental major by Captain Mcllrath. The division was ordered to return to the Kanawha Valley, where it arrived on November 10, having followed the entire distance over nearly same route that the 23rd took in 1861. On November 18, the regiment went into winter-quarters at the Falls of the Great Kanawha. During the campaigns of 1862, it had marched about 600 miles; but now, with the exception of occasional scouting, its duties were light.

Before departing Clarksburg, McKinley issued, for only the fourth time since leaving Ohio, soft bread as well as a better quality of hardtack than had been available with the AoP. While other Federal troops quickly forced the Confederates out of the Kanawha Valley, the Kanawha Division retraced its route from the prior year south from Clarksburg, through Weston, Bulltown, Sutton, and Summersville. Although the men of the 23rd Ohio and their division mates expected hard fighting as they returned to the Kanawha Valley, but the Rebels retreated ahead of the Kanawha's advance. The division arrived in greater Charleston on Monday, November 10. As the Confederates fled, elements of the division followed them as far as Gauley Bridge over the Kanawha River.

Meanwhile, while the division had been at Summersville, McKinley and eleven other sergeants from three regiments were sent back to Ohio on a recruiting trip. The year of service in the mountains and the Maryland Campaign had reduced the 23rd Ohio to roughly 40% of its strength when it left Ohio a year before. McKinley and his companions were sent to bring the numbers back up. McKinley was also told that when he had recruited nine men, his commission he was nominated for on September 25, would come through.

McKinley's group traveled to the new state house in Columbus, where they met with Gov. Tod, the new War Democrat who had succeeded Dennison as governor. Tod surprised McKinley and Company G's 25-year-old 1st Sgt. Milton DeShong giving them their commissions as 2nd Lieutenants, backdated to September 25 and October 15 respectively, for their outstanding performances at Antietam. (Note: Hayes had told the Governor Tod of McKinley's actions, and the governor said, "Let McKinley be promoted from sergeant to lieutenant." Twenty-six years later, McKinley wrote Hayes that "the proudest and happiest period of my life was when in 1862 I was sent from the regiment on recruiting service with other sergeants, and upon arriving at Columbus found that you had my commission as 2nd lieutenant, and that it had been issued upon your personal recommendation, for what as a boy, I had done at Antietam.")

McKinley went to Cleveland, where he worked with Company I's 1st Lt. Russell Hastings, who was also recruiting for the regiment for a few days while getting his officer's uniform (with Hastings' assistance) before returning to his hometown of Poland. The 19-year-old arrived home on Tuesday, November 18, relayed his experiences to his family, and set up his recruiting station After making recruiting his quota, the young officer returned to the regiment.

Hayes had suffered severely, and took several weeks to recuperate before he could return to active service. While he was recovering in Columbus, Scammon had been promoted to brigadier-general, and Dennison had canceled a planned colonelcy for Hayes at the 79th Ohio to keep him as colonel of the 23rd Ohio with an October 15 date of rank. This pleased the men of the regiment, and their demonstrations of gratification were as deeply felt as they were boisterous. Joined by his wife, Lucy, Hayes moved to a hospital in Cincinnati to continue his convalescence. On Friday, November 21, Hayes left Cincinnati on a river steamer up the Ohio and then Kanawha disembarking at Charleston where an ambulance took him to his regiment. Interestingly, Hayes never personally command the regiment in any further battles because he was detached from it soon after his return to act as brigadier-general of its brigade.

The march from Clarksburg back down to the Kanawha had been through the bleak hills of that mountainous terrain already swept by the cold autumn winds and rains. The 23rd Ohio and its comrades had endured sleet and rain for several days with little shelter enroute but under trees and wood too wet to make warm camp-fires. Near Charleston, at the falls of the Kanawha River, on Tuesday. November 18, the regiment went into winter-quarters having marched about 600 miles (970 km) during its service in 1862. From that time to the next March, the 23rd Ohio had a quiet period, and the soldiers found at the Kanawha Falls an opportunity to recuperate their worn and shattered bodies. As the year closed, the men worked to make their camp ready for winter and a return to the policing and counter-insurgency operations. In the Kanawha, as a result of the recent Confederate occupation, they found a much reduced local secessionist fervor and an eagerness among the majority for impending statehood. As such, the regiment found its military duties light.

At the camp at the Falls of the Great Kanawha, the men of the 23rd Ohio dug drainage ditches, sanded the streets, and built 60 log cabins with large fireplaces for the winter. In evening conversations, the men resolved to build a memorial monument after the war to honor their fallen comrades in Cleveland's Woodland Cemetery. Hayes, in the same vein, renamed the camp as Camp Reynolds to honor the 23rd Ohio's late sergeant major, Eugene Reynolds, taken prisoner at South Mountain and shot and bayoneted in trying to escape.

When McKinley returned to the regiment on Saturday, December 13, the new 2nd lieutenant impressed Hayes and the men in the regiment. Although promoted, he remained close to his Poland Guard/Company G comrades and pleased them by sharing a care package of cake he had received from home as he would have before his promotion into the officer corps. Assigned to Company D, the former Cleveland Rifle Grenadiers, he soon busied himself and his men by clearing the camp's parade ground. Like the other company officers, he studied tactical manuals and histories. Hayes, McKinley, and the 23rd Ohio closed out the year in much the same strategic situation as they had been in when they left four months before. On Christmas, Thursday, December 25, 1862, Hayes took command of the brigade.

While encamped near Fayetteville, West Virginia, about 20 Jewish members of the regiment held a makeshift Passover Seder on April 3, 1862, after their commander, Rutherford B. Hayes, granted them leave to observe the holiday.

=== 1864: Initial Operations in the Shenandoah ===
During March 1864, Lieutenant General Ulysses S. Grant became commander of all Union armed forces. Grant's strategy in Virginia was to attack the Lee's Army of Northern Virginia with the AoP directly, while other U.S. forces would attack toward Richmond from the east and destroy the railroads supplying Lee's army from western Virginia. The Virginia & Tennessee Railroad (V&TRR) and the Virginia Central Railroad (VCRR) were prime targets. Each of those two railroads also had more mileage within Virginia than any other railroad. Attacking the railroads would cause Lee to send troops west to protect vital railroad infrastructure, resulting in fewer men available to protect the Confederate capitol in Richmond.

While Grant sent Maj. Gen. Franz Sigel south up the Shenandoah Valley to Staunton, Virginia against the VCRR, (Note: The VCRR ran through Staunton and connected with Richmond over a 200 miles (320 km) long route into the upper Shenandoah Valley. The railroad had been used by Lee and Jackson to move troops in the 1862 Valley and Peninsula Campaigns. It was also used to move agricultural products and raw materials from the Shenandoah Valley to Richmond.) he ordered Brig. Gen. George Crook, who had replaced Cox as commander of the Kanawha Division, to attack the V&TRR, including its bridge over the New River. Crook would join Sigel at Staunton and advance to Lynchburg. Crook began making preparations in Charleston, West Virginia. By the end of April his troops were assembled further south in Fayetteville, and they began moving toward their destination on May 3.

=== 1865 ===
The regiment lost 5 officers and 154 enlisted men killed and mortally wounded, and 1 officer and 130 enlisted men by disease (total 290 out of 2230 who were members of the regiment at various times).

== Affiliations, battle honors, detailed service, and casualties ==
=== Organizational affiliation ===
Attached to:

- Attached to Cox's Kanawha Brigade, WV, to September 1861
- Scammon's Brigade, District of the Kanawha, WV, to October 1861
- 3rd Brigade, Kanawha Division, to March 1862
- 1st Brigade, Kanawha Division, Department of the Mountains, to September 1862
- 1st Brigade, Kanawha Division, IX Corps, Army of the Potomac (AoP), to October 1862
- 1st Brigade, Kanawha Division, District of West Virginia, Department of the Ohio, to March 1863
- 1st Brigade, 3rd Division, VIII Corps, Middle Department, to June 1863
- 1st Brigade, Scammon's Division, Department of West Virginia (DoWV), to December 1863
- 1st Brigade, 3rd Division, DoWV, to April 1864
- 1st Brigade, 2nd Infantry, Division West Virginia, to January 1865
- 1st Brigade, 1st Infantry, Division West Virginia, to April 1865
- 4th Provisional Division West Virginia to July 1865

=== List of battles ===
The official list of battles in which the regiment bore a part:

- Battle of Carnifex Ferry - September 10, 1862
- Battle of Clark's Hollow, WV - May 1, 1862
- Battle of Princeton, WV - May 15–18, 1862
- Battle of South Mountain - September 14, 1862
- Battle of Antietam - September 17, 1862
- Battle of Buffington Island, OH (Morgan's Raid) - July 19, 1863
- Battle of Cloyd's Mountain - May 9, 1864
- Battle of New River Bridge, VA - May 10, 1864
- Battle of Buffalo Gap, WV - June 6, 1864
- Battle of Lexington, WV - June 10–11, 1864
- Battle of Buchanan, VA - June 14, 1864
- Battle of Otter Creek, VA, - June 16, 1864
- Battle of Lynchburg, VA, - June 17–18, 1864
- Battle of Buford's Gap, VA, - June 21, 1864
- Second Battle of Kernstown, - July 24, 1864
- Battle of Berryville, - September 3–4, 1864
- Battle of Opequaon, - September 19, 1864
- Battle of Fisher's Hill, - September 22, 1864
- Battle of Cedar Creek, - October 19, 1864

=== Detailed service ===
The 23rd Ohio Volunteer Infantry's detailed service is as follows:

==== 1861 ====
- Organized at Camp Chase, Columbus, OH, and mustered on June 11, 1861
- Left State for Benwood, WV, July 25
- Moved to Weston July 28
- Duty at Weston, Suttonville, Summerville and Glenville till September
- Action at Cross Lanes, WV, August 26, 1861
- Action at Carnifex Ferry September 10
- Moved to Little Sewell Mountain September 15
- Retreat to New River October
- Operations in Kanawha Valley and New River Region October 19-November 16
- Cotton Mountain November 11–12
- At Fayette Court House till April, 1862
- Occupation of Raleigh Court House December 28, 1861, to April, 1862 (Cos. "A", "B," "F," "G").

==== 1862 ====
- Action at mouth of Blue Stone February 8
- Advance on Princeton April 23-May 1
- Camp Creek May 1 (Co. "C"). Princeton May 5
- Giles Court House May 7–10
- Flat Top Mountain July 4
- Pack's Ferry, New River, August 6
- Movement to Washington, DC, August 15–24
- Maryland Campaign September 6–22
- Battle of South Mountain September 14
- Battle Antietam September 16–17
- Moved to Chambersburg October 8
- Expedition after Stuart October 13–14
- Moved to Clarksburg, Suttonville, Summerville, Gauley Bridge and Kanawha Falls, October 26-November 14
- Duty at Falls of the Great Kanawha November 18, 1862, to March 15, 1863, and at Charleston till July

==== 1863 ====
- Expedition to Piney in pursuit of Loring July 5–14
- Thence moved in pursuit of Morgan July 2–26
- Action at Pomeroy, Ohio, July 18
- Little Hocking River July 19
- Return to Charleston, WV, and duty there till April 1864
- Morris Mills July 31, 1863
- Expedition to Wayne Court House November 24–28, 1863

==== 1864 ====
- Crook's Raid on Virginia & Tennessee Railroad May 2–19
- Battle of Cloyd's Mountain May 9
- New River Bridge and Doublin Depot May 10
- Meadow Bluff May 24
- Hunter's Raid to Lynchburg May 26-July 1
- Covington June 2
- Piedmont June 5
- Buffalo Gap June 6
- Lexington June 11–12
- Diamond Hill June 17
- Lynchburg June 17–18
- Buford's Gap June 19
- About Salem June 21
- Moved to Shenandoah Valley July 12–15
- Battle of Winchester July 24
- Martinsburg July 25
- Sheridan's Shenandoah Valley Campaign August 7-November 28
- Strasburg and Fisher's Hill August 15
- Summit Point August 24
- Halltown August 26
- Berryville September 3
- Battle of Opequan, Winchester, September 19
- Fisher's Hill September 22
- Battle of Cedar Creek October 19
- Duty at Kernstown till December 20
- Kablestown November 20 and 30
- Moved to Stephenson's Depot December 20
- Thence to Martinsburg, WV, December 29

==== 1865 ====
- To Cumberland, MD, January 1, 1865
- Duty at Cumberland till July
- Mustered out July 26, 1865.

=== Casualties and losses ===
Regiment lost during service 5 Officers and 154 Enlisted men killed and mortally wounded and 1 Officer and 130 Enlisted men by disease. Total 290.

== Notable members ==
- James M. Comly - Diplomat and journalist
- Rutherford B. Hayes - 19th president of the United States
- Robert P. Kennedy - Congressman from Ohio
- Stanley Matthews - U. S. Senator and Supreme Court Justice
- William McKinley - 25th president of the United States
- Harrison Gray Otis - Journalist
- William S. Rosecrans - Later commander of the Army of the Cumberland
- Eliakim P. Scammon - Career U.S. Army officer

== See also ==
- Ohio in the Civil War
