= 23rd Flying Training Squadron (JASDF) =

- 第23飛行隊
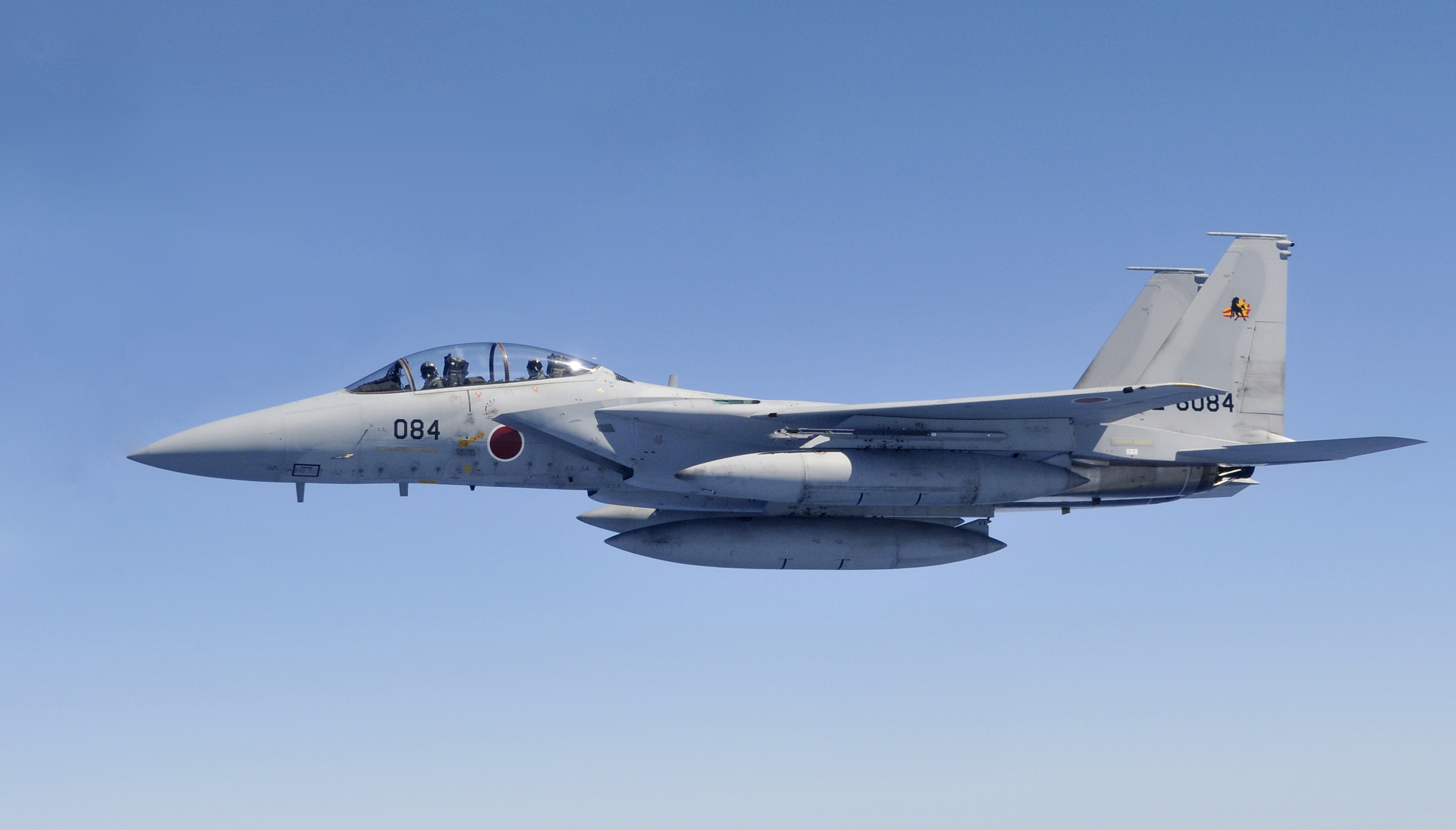
- 23rd Squadron Mitsubishi F-15DJ (2010)
- Active: October 6, 2000-present
- Country: Japan
- Allegiance: Air Training Command, Fighter Training Group
- Branch: Japan Air Self-Defense Force
- Garrison/HQ: Nyutabaru Air Base

The 23rd Flying Training Squadron (第23飛行隊, dai-ni-san-hikoutai) is a training squadron belonging to the Fighter Training Group of the Air Training Command of the Japan Air Self-Defense Force. It is based at Nyutabaru Air Base in Miyazaki Prefecture, Japan. It was formerly the 202nd Tactical Fighter Squadron.

== Aircraft operated ==
- Mitsubishi F-15J/DJ (2000-present)
- Kawasaki T-4 (2000-present)
