= Twenty-third Amendment =

The Twenty-third Amendment may refer to the:

- Twenty-third Amendment of the Constitution of India, 1969 amendment relating to reserved seats in the parliament, including the abolition of tribal reservation for Nagaland
- Twenty-third Amendment of the Constitution of Ireland, which permitted the state to recognise the International Criminal Court
- Twenty-third Amendment to the Constitution of Pakistan, which granted legal cover to military courts
- Twenty-third Amendment to the United States Constitution, which allowed residents of the District of Columbia to vote in presidential elections
