= 23rd Airborne Brigade (Ukraine) =

23rd Air Assault Brigade (25 Sep 1986 – Jan 1990) 23rd Airborne Brigade (Jan 1990 – 1992) 23rd Airmobile Brigade (1992 – 1 Jul 1995) 23rd Airmobile Border Detachment for Special Purposes (1 Jul 1995 – ?)
- Active: 1986–?
- Country: Soviet Union (1986–1992); Ukraine (1992–?)
- Branch: Soviet Army (1986–1990) Soviet airborne (1990–1992); Ukrainian Airmobile Forces (1992–1995); Ukrainian Border Troops (1995–1997) Security Service of Ukraine (1997–?)
- Type: Airborne
- Garrison/HQ: Kremenchuk

The 23rd Airborne Brigade (Ukrainian: 23-тя аеромобільна бригада, romanized: 23-tya aeromobil'na bryhada) was a military formation of the Soviet Airborne Forces. It was originally formed as the 23rd Separate Air Assault Brigade in 1986, but transferred to the Soviet Airborne in 1990 and became an airborne brigade. In 1992 it was transferred to Ukraine.

== History ==
The 23rd Separate Air Assault Brigade was activated on 25 September 1986 in Kremenchuk as part of the Southwestern Theatre of Military Operations. The brigade was composed of three airborne battalions, an air assault battalion, an artillery battalion and an antiaircraft artillery battalion. On 1 June 1990, the brigade was transferred to the Soviet airborne and redesignated as the 23rd Separate Airborne Brigade after its air assault battalion was disbanded. After the Dissolution of the Soviet Union, the brigade was transferred to Ukraine.

The brigade became the 23rd Separate Airmobile Brigade in the summer of 1992. It transferred to the Border Troops on 1 July 1995 and was renamed the 23rd Airmobile Border Detachment for Special Purposes. In 1997, it was transferred to the Security Service of Ukraine and reformed as a special unit.
