= 23rd Division (Yugoslav Partisans) =

Yugoslav Partisan military division formed in 1944

23rd Serbia Division
- Flag of Democratic Federal Yugoslavia (used by the Partisans)
- Active: 1944–1945
- Country: Democratic Federal Yugoslavia
- Branch: Yugoslav Partisan Army
- Type: Infantry
- Size: ~2,000 (June 1944)
- Engagements: World War II in Yugoslavia

The 23rd Serbia Division (Serbo-Croatian Latin: Dvadesettreća srpska divizija) was a Yugoslav Partisan division formed on 6 June 1944 as the 3rd Serbia Division in Toplica. It was formed from the 7th and 9th Serbia Brigades. On 17 June 1944, the 14th Serbia Brigade was added to the division which at the time numbered around 2,000 soldiers. The division was under the direct command of the Supreme Headquarters until 6 September 1944 when it became part of the 14th Corps. On 9 December 1944, it came under the command of the Southern Operational Group and in January 1945 it became part of the 2nd Army.
