= 23rd Reconnaissance Squadron (disambiguation) =

23rd Reconnaissance Squadron may refer to:

- The 23rd Bomb Squadron, designated the 23d Reconnaissance Squadron, Long Range (Photographic) from October 1947 to June 1949.
- The 413th Flight Test Squadron, constituted as the 23d Reconnaissance Squadron (Heavy) in January 1942 but redesignated the 413th Bombardment Squadron before being activated in July 1942.
- The 23rd Tactical Reconnaissance Squadron (Fighter), designated the 23rd Reconnaissance Squadron (Fighter) from April 1943 to August 1943.

== See also ==
- The 23rd Strategic Reconnaissance Squadron
- The 23rd Photographic Reconnaissance Squadron
