= Line 23 =

Line 23 may refer to:

- Line 23 (São Paulo Metro)
- Line 23 (Shanghai Metro)
- In Widescreen signaling, a signal is encoded in line 23 for PAL and SECAM systems
- Line 23 (Guangzhou Metro)

== See also ==
- Route 23 (disambiguation)
