= Carr B. White =

Union Army officer

Carr Bailey White
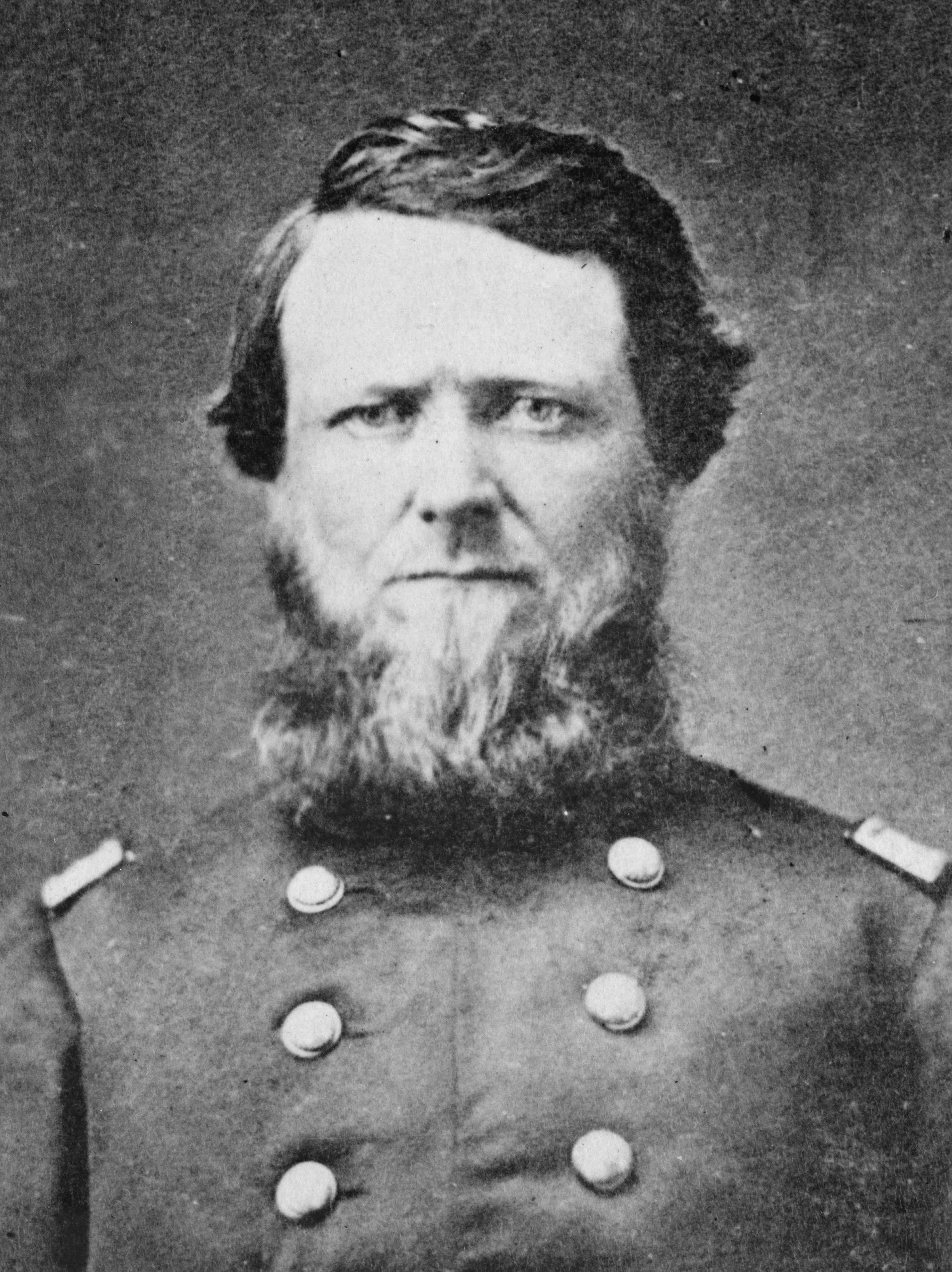
- White between 1861 and 1865
- Born: February 8, 1823; Mason County, Kentucky
- Died: September 30, 1871 (aged 48); Georgetown, Ohio
- Burial place: Old Georgetown Cemetery
- Military career
- Allegiance: United States of America; Union
- Branch: Union Army
- Rank: Brevet Brigadier General, U.S.V.
- Commands: 12th Ohio Infantry
- Conflicts: American Civil War: Battle of Scary Creek; Battle of Carnifex Ferry; Second Battle of Bull Run; Battle of South Mountain; Battle of Antietam; Battle of Cloyd's Mountain
- Other work: physician

Carr Baily White (1823–1871) was a medical doctor, an officer during the Mexican War and a general during the American Civil War. His Civil War service was entirely in western Virginia and Maryland.

White was born in Mason County, Kentucky, but moved to Ohio at a young age. where he attended Jefferson Medical College. During the Mexican War he enlisted as a private in the 1st Ohio Infantry. On February 1, 1847, he was promoted to captain in his regiment, and was mustered out of the volunteer service on June 14, 1847. When White was promoted to captain, it enraged 1st Lieutenant James P. Fyffe, who was passed over. Fyffe challenged White to a duel. Since General Zachary Taylor frowned upon dueling, they waited until the regiment was mustered out. White chose Ferdinand Van Derveer as his second. White and Fyffe met on an island while their transport refueled and fought with pistols. Both missed and the matter was then settled peacefully. White returned home to serve as a physician.

When the Civil War began, White enlisted in the 12th Ohio Infantry, being chosen its lieutenant colonel. The regiment saw action its first at the battle of Carnifex Ferry in western Virginia. The colonel, John W. Lowe, was killed, and on June 28, 1861, White was made its colonel. The 12th Ohio was attached to Jacob D. Cox's Kanawha Division at the Second Battle of Bull Run and during the Maryland Campaign. The regiment saw heavy fighting at Fox's Gap and fought again in the vicinity of Burnside's Bridge during the Battle of Antietam.

White and the Kanawha Division then returned to western Virginia, and the following spring White was given command of a brigade in the VIII Corps. From June to December, 1863 he commanded a brigade under Eliakim P. Scammon in the Department of West Virginia. During this time White helped organize a unit known as "Spencer's Scouts", after its first commander. White and Spencer's Scouts operated against Confederate partisan and guerrilla leaders in western Virginia, especially those under John S. Mosby.

In April 1864, White took command of the 2nd Brigade in George Crook's division of the Department of West Virginia. He fought at the battle of Cloyd's Mountain. White's brigade was made up of green regiments and sustained heavy casualties in their first and only battle. White led the brigade during the following Lynchburg Campaign, though they saw no combat.

White was mustered on July 11, 1864, and received a brevet promotion to brigadier general of U.S. Volunteers for his services at Cloyd's Mountain, dated March 13, 1865.

White returned to Ohio, settling in Georgetown. He died there in 1871 at the age of 48.
