= 23 Squadron =

23 Squadron or 23rd Squadron may refer to:

== Aviation squadrons ==
- No. 23 Squadron PAF, a unit of the Pakistan Air Force
- No. 23 Squadron RAAF, a unit of the Royal Australian Air Force
- 23rd Squadron (Iraq), a unit of the Iraqi Air Force
- No. 23 Squadron RAF, a unit of the United Kingdom Royal Air Force
- 23rd Aero Squadron, a former designation of the 23rd Bomb Squadron
- 23rd Aeromedical Evacuation Squadron, a unit of the United States Air Force
- 23d Antisubmarine Squadron, a former unit of the United States Army Air Forces
- 23rd Bomb Squadron, a unit of the United States Air Force
- 23rd Fighter Squadron, a unit of the United States Air Force
- 23rd Flying Training Squadron, a unit of the United States Air Force
- 23rd Flying Training Squadron (JASDF), a unit of the Japanese Air Self Defense Force
- 23d Helicopter Squadron, a former unit of the United States Air Force
- 23rd Tactical Air Support Squadron, a former designation of the 23rd Flying Training Squadron
- 23d Troop Carrier Squadron, a former unit of the United States Army Air Forces
- Marine Air Control Squadron 23, a unit of the United States Marine Corps

== See also ==
- 23d Reconnaissance Squadron (disambiguation)

== Naval squadrons ==
- Destroyer Squadron 23, a formation of the United States Navy
