= 23rd Battalion =

23rd Battalion may refer to:

- 23rd Reserve Battalion, CEF, an infantry unit in the Canadian Expeditionary Force during the First World War
- 23 Service Battalion, a Combat Service Support unit of The Canadian Forces Reserve since 1965
- 23rd Battalion (Australia), an infantry battalion of the Australian Army that served in World War I
- 2/23rd Battalion (Australia), an infantry battalion of the Australian Army that served in World War II
- 23rd Battalion (New Zealand), a World War II infantry battalion
