= 23rd Regiment =

23rd Regiment may refer to:

== Infantry regiments ==
- 23rd Marching Regiment of Foreign Volunteers, a unit of the French Army
- 23rd Regiment of Bombay Light Infantry, a unit of the British Army
- 23rd Regiment of Foot, a unit of the British Army
- 23rd Infantry Regiment (United States), a unit of the United States Army
- 23rd Marine Regiment (United States), a unit of the United States Marine Corps
- 23rd Arkansas Infantry Regiment, a unit of the Confederate States Army
- 23rd Tennessee Infantry Regiment, a unit of the Confederate States Army
- 23rd Connecticut Infantry Regiment, a unit of the Union Army
- 23rd Indiana Infantry Regiment, a unit of the Union Army
- 23rd Illinois Infantry Regiment, a unit of the Union Army
- 23rd Iowa Volunteer Infantry Regiment, a unit of the Union Army
- 23rd Regiment Kentucky Volunteer Infantry, a unit of the Union Army
- 23rd Regiment Massachusetts Volunteer Infantry, a unit of the Union Army
- 23rd Michigan Infantry Regiment, a unit of the Union Army
- 23rd Missouri Infantry Regiment, a unit of the Union Army
- 23rd New York Infantry Regiment, a unit of the Union Army
- 23rd Ohio Infantry, a unit of the Union Army
- 23rd Pennsylvania Infantry, a unit of the Union Army
- 23rd Wisconsin Volunteer Infantry Regiment, a unit of the Union Army

== Cavalry regiments ==
- 23rd Dragoon Regiment (France), a unit of the French Army
- 23rd Light Dragoons, a unit of the British Army
- 23rd Virginia Cavalry, a unit of the Confederate States Army

== Engineering regiments ==
- 23 Engineer Regiment (Air Assault) (United Kingdom), a unit of the British Army's Royal Engineers

== Artillery regiments ==
- 23rd Regiment, Royal Australian Artillery, a unit of the Royal Australian Artillery
- 23rd Field Regiment, RCA, a unit of the Royal Canadian Artillery
- 23rd Field Artillery Regiment (United States), a unit of the United States Army
- 23rd Coast Artillery (United States), a unit of the United States Army

== Armoury regiments ==
- 23rd Regiment Armory
