= Blazer's Scouts =

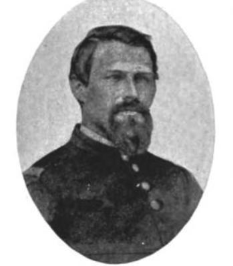
- Captain Richard R. Blazer
- Active: September 1863 to January 1865
- Country: United States
- Allegiance: (Union (American Civil War)) Union
- Branch: Union Army
- Type: Cavalry
- Role: Guerrilla warfare, Reconnaissance
- Engagements: American Civil War

Commanders
- Captain: John W. Spencer 1863
- Captain: Richard R. Blazer 1864

Blazer's Scouts was a special force in the Union Army that existed from September 1863 through 1864 during the American Civil War. Members of this force operated in West Virginia and Virginia, and were expert woodsmen with excellent marksmanship skills. They specialized in anti-guerrilla warfare, counterinsurgency, and reconnaissance (a.k.a. scouting). The tactics of elite forces and intelligence gathering were refined by Richard R. Blazer, and had influence on future American special forces.

Blazer's Scouts was originally one company formed in response to harassment by pro-Confederate sympathizers that used guerrilla warfare hit–and–run tactics. The entire force consisted of 80 to 120 soldiers and officers, although operations were often conducted using smaller groups. The company was officially known as the Independent Scouts, but became known as Blazer's Scouts to soldiers on both sides of the conflict. Although Lieutenant Richard Blazer was not the original leader of the company, he often commanded it in the field. Eventually he was promoted to captain when the unit was expanded and moved to Virginia.

The company originally consisted of chosen soldiers from three infantry regiments. In the spring of 1864 it was expanded, mounted, and efforts were made to arm it with better weapons. During late summer 1864, the unit was assigned scouting duties for Major General Philip Sheridan's Army of the Shenandoah, but its highest priority was neutralizing John S. Mosby's partisan rangers. All members of Blazer's Scouts were armed with 7–shot Spencer repeating rifles and revolvers. After some initial success against Mosby, the unit was defeated by Mosby's Rangers on November 18, 1864. Blazer was captured, his second–in–command killed, and over half of his company killed, wounded, or captured.

== Background ==
Fighting in the American Civil War began on April 12, 1861. The state (or commonwealth) of Virginia seceded from the United States on April 17, 1861, and joined seven southern states (three additional states seceded later) in the Confederate States of America. In the northern and western portions of Virginia, many people preferred to remain loyal to the United States (a.k.a. the Union). Virginians loyal to the United States approved pursuing their own statehood on October 24, 1861, and the western portion of Virginia officially became the state of West Virginia on June 20, 1863. (Note: During the war and prior to the creation of West Virginia, both the Confederacy and Union had "Virginia" regiments. An example of this is the 2nd Virginia Cavalry Regiment that was Confederate, and the 2nd Regiment of Loyal Virginia Cavalry (2nd West Virginia Cavalry Regiment) that was Union. Reports from Union officers made early in the war sometimes referred to the loyal Union regiments as Virginia regiments. To avoid confusion, authors typically call the pro-Union Virginia regiments "West Virginia" regiments.) While the northern portion of the new state along the Ohio River was mostly pro-Union, that was not the case further south.

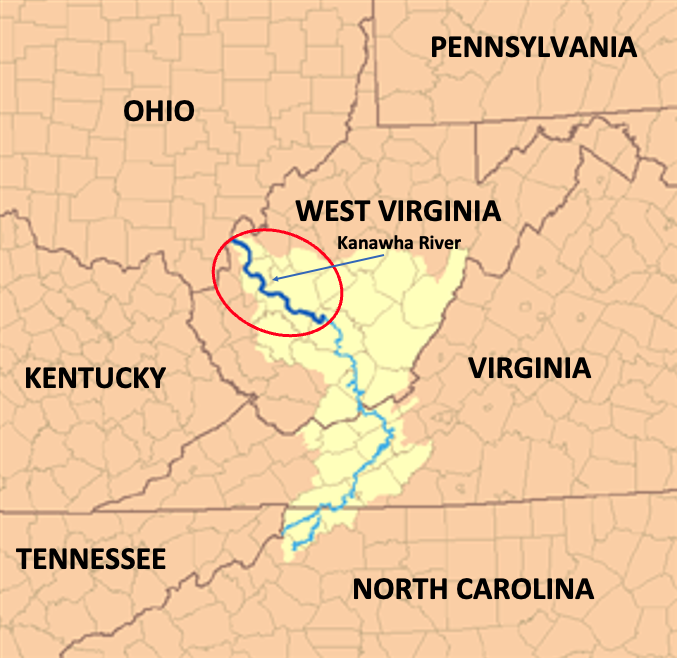
West Virginia and the Kanawha River

The Union victory in the 1861 Battle of Philippi helped secure northwestern Virginia for the Union, but the Confederacy contested the territory further southwest. One region further southwest is the Kanawha River Valley, which had resources such as salt and food. (Note: Salt, an essential part of the diet for humans and livestock, was also used for preserving meat during the time of the American Civil War.) Many of the Kanawha Valley residents were already skilled users of horses and weapons, so Union and Confederate leaders viewed the region as a good place to recruit soldiers. This portion of West Virginia, and the region further east, had many people loyal to the Confederacy. For example: In 1860, Greenbrier County (along the future border with Virginia) had 2,474 white male residents between the ages of 18 and 55; and about 2,000 of them eventually served in the Confederate Army. The Union Army had to contest the Confederate Army in this region (such as in the Kanawha Valley Campaign of 1862), and it faced the additional challenge of irregular tactics used by guerrilla warriors and partisan rangers. The guerrilla tactics of hit–and–run proved successful, and Union soldiers referred to these irregular fighters as bushwhackers. Among notorious guerrilla fighter groups in West Virginia were the Moccasin Rangers and Thurmond's Partisan Rangers.

Blazer's Scouts were a Union response to bushwhackers in West Virginia. There were three iterations of Blazer's Scouts. The first version was a company organized in September 1863 as the "Independent Scouts". It was officially disbanded in mid-November 1863, but participated in an additional excursion in December of the same year. In February 1864, Brigadier General George Crook expanded the focus, and size, of what he called "Division Scouts". The third version existed when Major General Philip Sheridan moved his army into the Shenandoah Valley later in 1864, and this version had the objective of eliminating the infamous Confederate partisan cavalry battalion known as Mosby's Rangers. All three of these versions of Union scouts were led mostly by Lieutenant (and later Captain) Richard Blazer. They became known "familiarly in the army" as "Blazer's Scouts". (Note: The soldiers in the company identified themselves as "Blazer's Scouts, "Brigade Scouts", "Division Scouts", and "Independent Scouts". Confederate sources have said Blazer's Scouts were called the "Legion of Honor", but this was not a term used by Union soldiers.)

== Organization ==
=== Organization of the first version ===
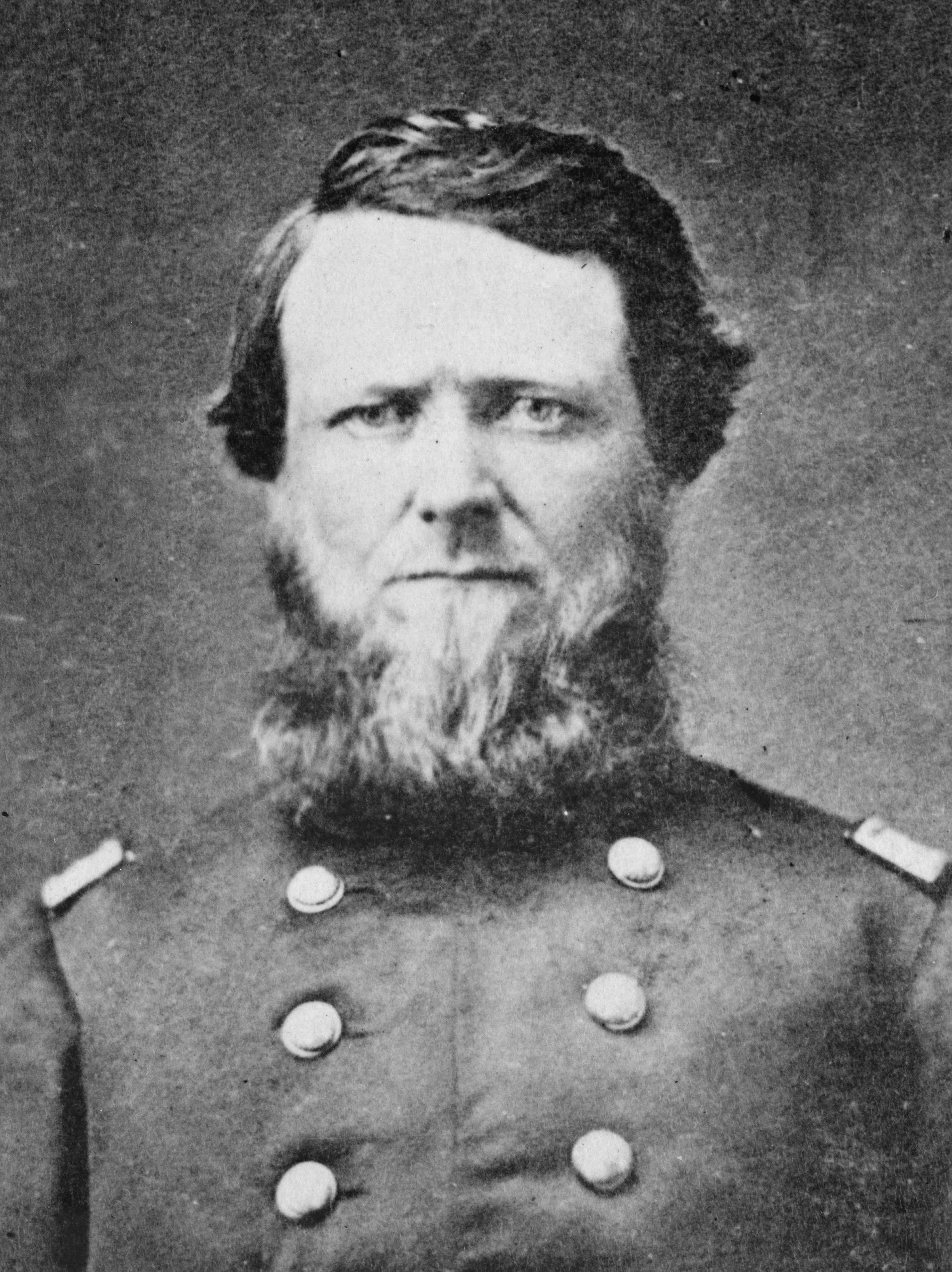
Col. White

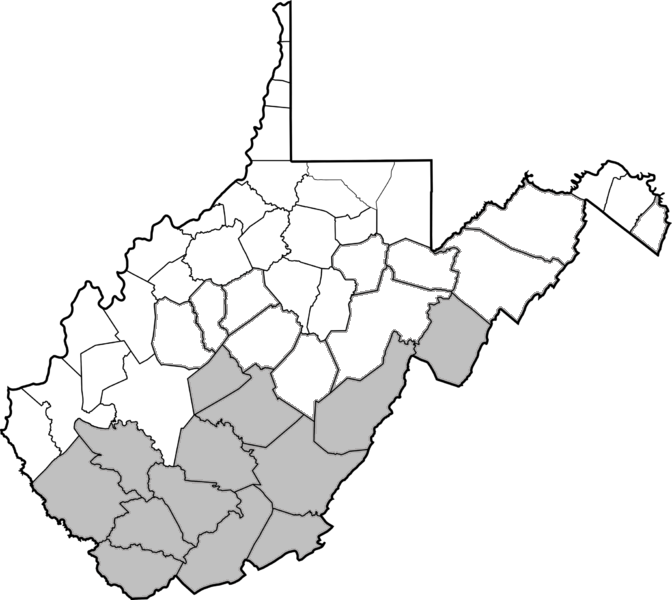
Confederacy controlled counties, February 1863

Colonel Carr B. White commanded a Union brigade that operated in West Virginia. The brigade was part of a division commanded by Brigadier General E. Parker Scammon, and it operated at Charleston, Coals Mouth, Fayetteville, Gauley Bridge, Camp Piatt, and Camp White. On September 5, 1863, White signed order number 49 to create what he called Independent Scouts. This company was to have 100 soldiers plus three officers and 16 non–commissioned officers. (Note: Non–commissioned officers are typically ranked no higher than sergeant. In the case of Colonel White's order, the non-commissioned officers were to be eight sergeants and eight corporals.) The new volunteer company would scout for White's brigade, and it would not participate in camp duties. Its own camp would be located in the woods, and the company would only accept experienced woodsmen and good shooters.

Even though White's order called for three lieutenants, the company started with a captain and two lieutenants. The first commander of the Independent Scouts was Captain John Spencer, and his two lieutenants were Richard Blazer and Harrison Gray Otis. Spencer was from the 9th West Virginia Infantry Regiment, while Blazer and Otis were from the 91st Ohio and 12th Ohio Infantry regiments, respectively. (Note: The Otis family home in Marietta, Ohio, was a station on the Underground Railroad, used by slaves to escape to freedom.) Those three regiments, plus an artillery battery, comprised White's brigade. The enlisted men were selected from the same three infantry regiments. Some of the men in the new company had been Jessie Scouts, a group of scouts that often wore Confederate uniforms and had been organized by Major General John C. Frémont. White's new company became known at the time as "Spencer's Scouts" or the "Brigade Scouts". Spencer served for only a short time, leaving Blazer and Otis to command the scouts in the field. (Note: One source says Spencer resigned from the scouts. Another source believes he was ordered to take two companies (of regular infantry) to Roane and Calhoun counties, and was then involved with a court martial that was eventually dismissed.)

In November 1863, White issued an order that said "The company of detached men acting as scouts under command of Lieutenants Blazer and Otis having accomplished the ends for which it was formed is hereby disbanded and the men will be returned to their various Regiments and Companies for duty...." White was complimentary of the Scouts, and also praised them in discussions with his superiors. Despite being officially disbanded, special orders in early December sent Blazer with some of his scouts to the front of a Union expedition to Lewisburg. Otis did not participate in this expedition as a Scout, but instead commanded his own company in one of the Ohio infantries serving in the raid.

=== Organization of the second version ===
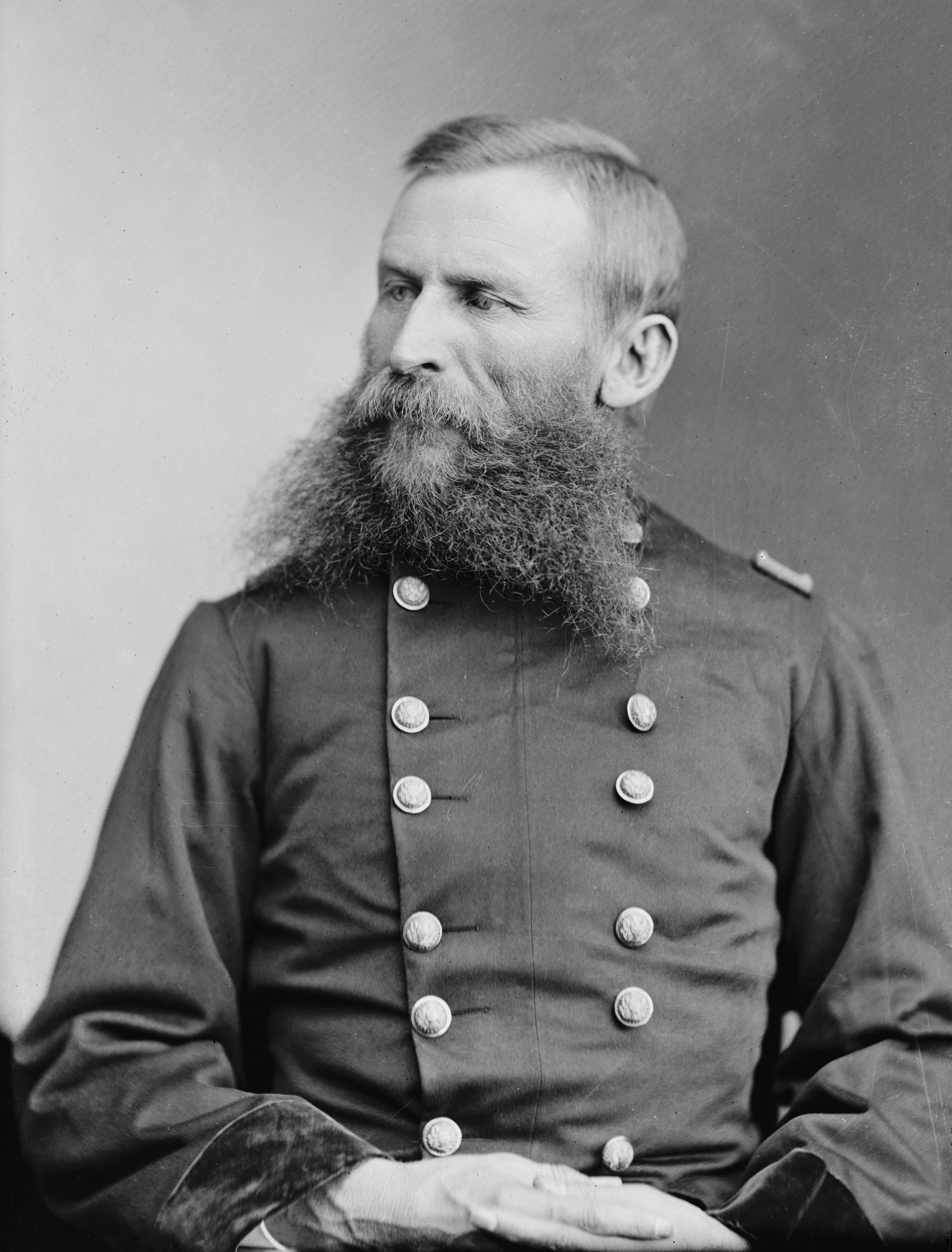
Brig. Gen. Crook

During February 1864, Brigadier General George Crook became commander of the Army of West Virginia, including the regiments from which the first version of Blazer's Scouts originated. Headquarters were in Charleston, West Virginia. Crook had fought native Americans in the Oregon Territory before the American Civil War, and therefore had experience against a cunning enemy who did not fight using traditional European methods. During February, he issued General Order No. 2 that reformed the Scouts as a mounted company under the command of Lieutenant Blazer. Blazer chose Lieutenant James Ewing, of the 9th West Virginia Infantry, as his second–in–command.

Crook called the new company his Division Scouts. The company had selected individuals from the 5th, 9th, and 13th West Virginia infantries; the 2nd West Virginia Cavalry; and the 12th, 23rd, 34th and 91st Ohio infantries. The company's size was about 80 soldiers. Crook tried to get this company repeating rifles such as the Henry or Spencer, but could not immediately acquire them. Some of the new Division Scouts, such as those from the 2nd West Virginia Cavalry, already had Spencer repeating rifles. (Note: Author Darl L. Stephenson believes the soldiers from the 34th Ohio Infantry, which would include those from that regiment in the Division Scouts, may have acquired Spencer rifles sometime after April.) Crook expected his Division Scouts to have satisfactory skills handling horses. In the case of those from the 2nd West Virginia Cavalry and 34th Ohio (Mounted) Infantry, those skills had already been attained.

=== Organization of the third version ===
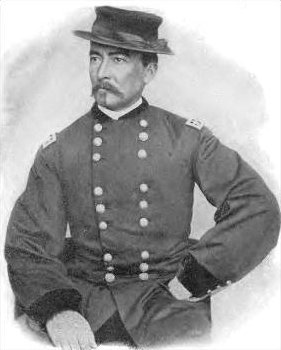
Maj. Gen. Sheridan

During August 1864, Major General Philip Sheridan took command of the Union Army of the Shenandoah, which included Crook's Army of West Virginia. Sheridan's force was often harassed by Confederate partisan rangers, especially a group known as Mosby's Rangers that was led by John S. Mosby. At sunrise on August 13 near Berryville, Virginia, Mosby attacked a Union wagon train. He captured over 200 Union soldiers; 700 horses, mules, and cattle; and roughly 100 wagons in what became known as the Berryville Wagon Train Raid.

Furious after the Berryville Wagon Train Raid, Sheridan decided that he needed to organize his own scouts. In addition to scouting for Sheridan's entire army, the scouts would have a mission of destroying Mosby's Rangers. He conferred with Crook, who recommended Blazer. Sheridan upgraded Blazer's Scouts to 100 soldiers, and ordered 100 Spencer repeating rifles for them. Blazer was promoted to captain. Among Blazer's subordinate officers was Lieutenant Thomas K. Coles.

== Early action ==
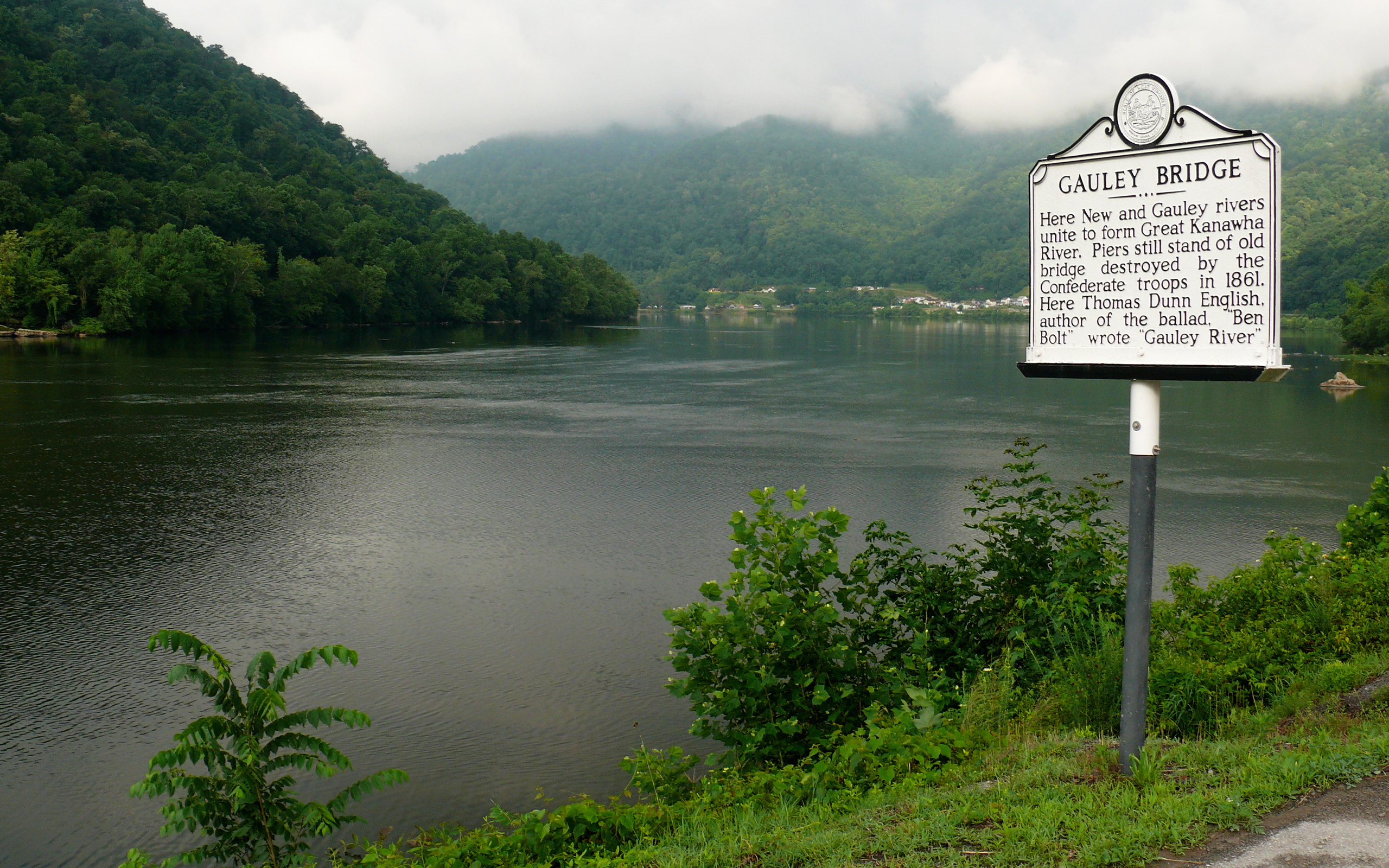
Gauley Bridge in 2008

Blazer's Scouts began their work almost immediately after their September 1863 organization by Colonel White. The company began operating in the region near the Gauley and New rivers, which combine to form the Kanawha River. The area had some of the roughest terrain in the eastern United States. In addition to fighting guerrillas, much of the Scout's work involved questioning civilians and following tracks in the mountains.

On the first mission led by Lieutenant Blazer, 13 Confederate partisans from Thurmond's Rangers were captured while Blazer's force of about half the company had no casualties. A different mission, led by Lieutenant Otis, got the attention of Confederate leadership when two buildings near Blue Sulphur Springs were burned—including a Baptist Church. The "church" had no pews or seats, and had been used as a quarters by Thurmond's Rangers and a regular Confederate army unit. For the next few months, the Scouts pioneered tactics to counter Confederate guerrillas in the region. They also served as the advance guard when White's brigade patrolled.

=== November Lewisburg Dublin Raid ===
Important points for the 1863 & 1864 railroad raids

On October 26, 1863, Union Brigadier General Benjamin Franklin Kelley ordered a raid with the purpose of driving the Confederate Army out of Lewisburg and disabling the Virginia & Tennessee Railroad near its Dublin Station. While a force led by Brigadier General William W. Averell moved south from Beverly to Lewisburg, a second force approached Lewisburg by moving southeast from Charleston. The Charleston force was commanded by Brigadier General Alfred N. Duffié, and had Blazer's Scouts (with Blazer and Otis) leading the way. (Note: Although Duffié's report does not mention Blazer's Scouts, it does say "Much credit is due Colonel White and his command for cordial co–operation in the labors and objects of the expedition.")

On November 6, Averell's force was intercepted 30 miles (48 km) north of Lewisburg in what became known as the Battle of Droop Mountain. After fighting for several hours, Confederate leadership received information that Duffié's command was approaching Lewisburg from the west. Not wanting to be totally surrounded on Droop Mountain, and already attacked near its left flank, the Confederate Army fled south and then east to Virginia before Duffié could prevent its escape. The Scouts did some fighting with Thurmond's Rangers. The mission was ended before any damage could be inflicted to the railroad.

=== December Salem Raid ===
"Blazer taught his scouts to move with celerity and adapt to changing situations. He instructed them to never make camp until late at night and to break camp before daylight every morning. Instead of operating in the field for long periods of time, his scouts would go on missions lasting only a few days when reliable information was presented to them. Most importantly, he taught his scouts to treat the Southern people humanely and kindly."

— Author Robert P. Broadwater in his book Civil War Special Forces

In early December 1863, plans were made for another attack by Averell on the Virginia & Tennessee Railroad (near Salem, Virginia) while other Union forces moved toward Lewisburg and Staunton, Virginia. Brigadier General Eliakim P. Scammon ordered Blazer to put together a force to scout Lewisburg. Blazer used many of the soldiers he had used earlier as part of his Independent Scouts. They moved on foot, and some were dressed as Confederate soldiers. Lieutenant Otis was not part of this unit because he was leading a company of the 12th Ohio Infantry.

Blazer's force skirmished with Thurmond's Rangers on Big Sewell Mountain enroute to Lewisburg, but still reached the town. Portions of Scammon's command entered the town on December 14, while Otis' Company skirmished with Thurmond on Big Sewell Mountain. Fearing that his return route was beginning to be occupied by Confederate Army regulars and guerrillas, Scammon retreated through a snowstorm. Averell was able to reach Salem and damage railroad infrastructure (rail, ties, and five bridges) before escaping pursuit by six Confederate forces.

== Crook's Division Scouts ==
The Division Scouts began missions in early March 1864 around Charleston. Their task was to pursue guerrillas. By that time they would not take any of Thurmond's Rangers as prisoners, since those guerrillas typically executed Scouts. By May, a newspaper reported that bushwhackers had been driven out of the Kanawha Valley.

=== May 1864 Dublin raid ===
Dublin and Salem railroad stations on the Virginia & Tennessee Railroad

In March Crook was ordered to attack the Virginia & Tennessee Railroad, including its bridge over the New River near Central Depot. From there, Crook would form a junction with Major General Franz Sigel at Staunton and advance to Lynchburg. Crook began making preparations at his Charleston headquarters. By the end of April his troops were assembled and began moving toward their destination on May 2.

As part of Crook's plan, Blazer's Scouts and the 5th West Virginia Infantry were sent toward Lewisburg as a diversion. This group marched along the Lewisburg Pike making as much noise as possible. (Note: Crook reported "I sent the Fifth Virginia Infantry, Col. A. A. Tomlinson commanding, with Lieutenant Blazer's scouts....") This diversion was successful. The decoy force was attacked, while Crook was able to advance most of the way to Dublin (to Princeton). On May 9, Crook's main force won the "most significant battle in Southwest Virginia" just north of Dublin, known as the Battle of Cloyd's Mountain, and burned the railroad bridge across the New River on May 10.

=== Lynchburg Campaign ===
Sigel never made it to Staunton, as he was defeated in the Battle of New Market on May 15. Major General David Hunter replaced Sigel on May 21, and Blazer's Division Scouts took the advance as Crook's force joined Hunter at Staunton. The first stop enroute to Lynchburg was Lexington, and Blazer's Scouts led the way. They found hidden canal boats with artillery, and made a raid into the mountains where they found more hidden goods. Eventually, Hunter's force was unable to capture Lynchburg, and made a long retreat to West Virginia while low on rations. Officers and men, including the Scouts, were critical of Hunter's leadership and failure to attack Lynchburg before enemy reinforcements arrived.

Following the retreat to West Virginia, Crook's army was moved via railroad to the Shenandoah Valley at Harper's Ferry. Guerrilla forces for the Scouts to contend with included White's Battalion (a.k.a. White's Comanches}, which was commanded by Elijah V. White; and Mosby's Rangers, which was commanded by John S. Mosby. The Scouts were also used as sharpshooters. On August 23, Blazer's Scouts received Spencer rifles ordered for them by Major General Philip Sheridan. Additional soldiers joined the Scouts and increased their manpower to 100. Blazer was instructed that his mission was to force Mosby out of the Shenandoah Valley.

== Blazer's Scouts hunt for Mosby ==
"Capt. Blazer was not only a brave man and a hard fighter, but by his humane and kindly treatment, in striking contrast with the usual conduct of our enemies, he had so disarmed our citizens that instead of fleeing on his approach and notifying all soldiers, thus giving them a chance to escape, but little notice was taken of him. Consequently many of our men were "gobbled up" before they were aware of his presence."

— Member of Mosby's Rangers (Confederate)

Blazer's Scouts were armed with one (often two) pistols in addition to their seven–shot Spencer rifles and/or carbines. These handguns were Colt Navy or Colt Army six–shot revolvers. Using criteria of speed, agility, and performance in combat; they also made sure they had the best horses available. Operating in territory hostile to non-Confederates, Blazer's Scouts often had a small group from the company dressed as Confederate soldiers (Jessie Scouts) that patrolled in advance of the column.

Mosby's fighters preferred Colt Army Model 1860 revolvers. They believed that the sabers often used by Union cavalry were "antiquated" and "utterly worthless" against the six-shot revolvers they (Mosby's Rangers) used. Mosby patrolled an area west of Washington, D.C., known as "Mosby's Confederacy". It is loosely defined as the Virginia counties of Clarke, Fauquier, Loudoun, Prince William and Warren.

Blazer's Scouts began patrolling Mosby's Confederacy. On August 25, they defeated a partisan force led by John Mobberly, capturing six. Described as "a gang of murderers infesting Loudon", Mobberly's force had broken away from another partisan rangers group known as White's Comanches. (Note: John Mosby did not tolerate Mobberly's treatment of prisoners. The few prisoners Mobberly did not immediately murder often died from exposure or starvation.) Next, the Scouts began patrolling the Blue Ridge Mountains along the west side of Mosby's Confederacy.

=== Meyer's Ford ===
Blazer's Scouts and Mosby's Rangers had their major fights along the western edge of Mosby's Confederacy

In early September, the Scouts were patrolling near the Virginia and West Virginia border not far from the Shenandoah River. They surprised two encamped companies of Mosby's Rangers, totaling to 150 to 200 fighters, commanded by Lieutenant Joseph N. Nelson. After about 30 minutes of fighting at close range, the Rangers fled. Blazer's command had one killed and four wounded. Nelson's command had seven killed, five wounded, and six captured. After the fight, Blazer crossed the Shenandoah River at Meyer's Ford and rode to Meyerstown, West Virginia (near Harper's Ferry). This was Mosby's worst defeat of the war.

Over the next two months, Blazer (or portions of his command) had small confrontations with Confederate guerrillas in Loudoun County, at Myers' Ford, on the Berryville Pike, near Summit Point, at White Post near Ashby's Gap, and near Front Royal. Blazer's Scouts also crossed the Shenandoah Valley and went to North Mountain looking for McNeill's Rangers, and caught several of them.

=== The Vineyard ===
In mid–November, Company D from Mosby's Rangers ambushed some Union cavalry on the Valley Pike. Of the 17 Union soldiers they encountered: seven were killed or wounded, and nine were taken prisoner. Afterwards, the company was split. Those that lived in Loudoun County rode to Castleman's Ferry to return home. The remaining portion of the company, with the prisoners, moved toward Berry's Ferry in order to return to their homes in Fauquier County.

The Rangers heading to Fauquier County soon found themselves facing a dozen riders in Confederate uniforms, who were actually Jessie Scouts for Blazer's main column. After taking two casualties, the Confederates fled with Blazer's soldiers in Confederate uniforms chasing them. They reformed at a vineyard near Millwood, Virginia. The house overlooking the grapevines was owned by the widow of Philip Pendleton Cooke. Fighting went on in the pastures around the house, but the Rangers again fled. The chase continued to Burwell's Island in the Shenandoah River. When the fighting ended, Blazer's Scouts collected several prisoners, including one mortally wounded. By this time, Blazer's Scouts consisted of about 63 soldiers. Casualties, promotions, and the expiration of three–year enlistments depleted the unit.

=== Battle of Kabletown ===
Richards and Blazer fought near Myers Town and Kable Town

The news of the Ranger defeat at the vineyard enraged Mosby. On November 16 he sent three companies (200 to 300 fighters) toward the West Virginia border to search for Blazer. The three companies were led by Captain Adolphus "Dolly" Richards, and they searched in the border area where Loudoun County met West Virginia. On November 18, they rode to a camp northeast of Berryville, Virginia. Richards sent two riders to scout near Charles Town, West Virginia—John Puryear and Charles McDonough. Riding toward Kabletown, West Virginia, they saw some riders in Confederate uniforms in the distance. While McDonough hung back, Puryear approached the group of riders who were actually Blazer's Jessie Scout advance. Puryear was immediately captured and brought back to Lieutenant Coles, who was Blazer's second in command. (Note: Much of the Battle of Kabletown action took place in Myers Town, West Virginia, which is now known as Meyerstown.) Puryear would later claim that Coles tortured him as part of a failed effort to get the location of the Rangers. McDonough rode back to Richards and notified him, while the Jessie Scouts returned to Blazer's camp. (Note: One source says that Coles "was noted for his generosity and bravery. It is unlikely he tortured a prisoner in his care.") Blazer's force was said to total to 65 riders. This November 18 action became known as the Battle of Kabletown.

Private Henry Pancake was one of 16 Jesse Scouts for Blazer on that day. He knew he could not surrender because he would probably be executed for wearing a Confederate uniform. He was able to escape the pursuit of Richards' Rangers. Shortly after dusk, he was captured by Union pickets, and he was unable to convince them he was one of Blazer's Scouts until about 11:00 that evening.

Both sides became aware of the other's position. In the case of Blazer, he was warned by a young African American sent by a pro-Union woman who lived nearby. Although Richards had a numerical advantage, he needed to fight in close quarters in order to negate the advantage of Blazer's Spencer repeating rifles. Blazer's riders entered a field, possibly near the Meyer's Ford road, with an adjacent woods. They were able to get off one good volley before both sides became intermingled, which gave the advantage back to the Rangers. Soon, the outnumbered Scouts were fleeing.

Lieutenant Coles was shot and fell wounded from his horse. He was shot dead by Puryear while on the ground. After an initial attempt at escaping, Captain Blazer surrendered and that act may have enabled some of his soldiers to escape. (Note: Stories of this battle related years later by Mosby's men "are filled with discrepancies and embellishments and do not match the lay of the land near Myer Town".) One author's research shows Blazer's losses as 19 killed, 16 captured, and seven wounded (and not captured) of the 63 in the fight. Those losses included the unit's commander and second–in–command. Mosby considered those that assisted Union soldiers as traitors, and dealt with them harshly. African Americans who informed faced violence and death. A young African American, probably the one who had warned Blazer about Richards, was hung by Mosby's Rangers.

One author believes that Blazer's "decision to force an engagement against an overwhelming force seems uncharacteristic". He speculates that Blazer thought his Scouts would have enough time to fire more volleys from their Spencer repeating rifles, which would nullify some of the numerical advantage, before the Rangers would be within handgun range. Another description of the battle, from a book about Mosby, claims Richards had a force of two companies totaling to 110 soldiers while Blazer had 75 soldiers. (Note: Conflicting with the low number of Confederate soldiers, author Stephenson writes: "...Companies A, B, and D comprised the 1st Squadron at Myer's Ford and there is no explanation why Company D was left out of accounts of the Kabletown fight. In fact, Mosby Ranger Richard E. Hopkins of Company D describes the fight in his own memoirs, indicating that Company D was at Kabletown.") This description has Blazer being tricked by Richards' Company A, which appeared to be retreating while Company B was hidden. As Blazer pursued the retreating Confederates, Company A reversed its course and charged. At the same time, Company B attacked Blazer's left flank. (Note: Disagreeing with the feigned retreat and trap account, author Stephenson writes: "Accounts close to the actual battle, however, suggest that the encounter may not have occurred according to fable. It is very likely that this was a "meeting engagement" that turned out disastrously for Blazer's little band of scouts.")

== Aftermath ==
1864 newspaper article

Most of the prisoners captured at the Battle of Kabletown, including Blazer, were sent to Richmond area prisons such as Libby Prison or Belle Isle. They were exchanged during February 1865. Blazer would eventually return to his home town of Gallipolis, Ohio. He died on October 29, 1878. Instead of replenishing Blazer's Scouts, Sheridan chose to form a different group of scouts to be led by Major Henry Young of the 2nd Rhode Island Infantry Regiment. Sheridan also chose to not mention Blazer's Scouts when he wrote his autobiography. The entire unit of Blazer's Scouts was disbanded in 1865 per special order no. 1, which was issued January 2, 1865. Those remaining members of the unit rejoined their previous regiments.

Many of the soldiers from the 9th West Virginia Infantry (a supplier of soldiers for Blazer's Scouts) came from areas that had a large portion of the population sympathetic to the Confederacy. They endured the threat of being bushwhacked, lynched, or having their home burned. Following the war, one member of the Scouts wrote a book about this experiences. In his recollections, he only named the officers or himself—omitting a roster of the enlisted men in the unit. (Note: The author of the 1865 book about Blazer's Scouts is Asbe Montgomery. The name of his book is An Account of R.R Blazer and His Scouts, Operations in West Virginia and in Loudoun and the Shenandoah Valley, Against William and Philip Thurman, and Mosby, the Great Guerillas. By Asbe Montgomery, One of the Scouts and Belonging to Captain Blazer's Company.)

== Impact ==
Blazer's Scouts had only a few major fights with Mosby's Rangers, and the November 18 encounter decimated the Scouts. However, Blazer's impact was that during the months that he operated in Mosby's Confederacy, he made it more difficult for Mosby to disrupt Sheridan's supply lines. This was done by using Mosby's own hit–and–run tactics: Blazer was harassing Mosby's scouting parties by attacking the small number of riders in Mosby's rear or Mosby's vanguard.

Blazer's Scouts was one of the first elite military units for combating guerrillas. They conducted raids behind enemy lines that are in some ways similar to today's elite combat units such as the Army Rangers and Green Berets. They were also experts at gathering intelligence, using a procedure of "winning the hearts and minds" of local civilian populations. The concepts of elite forces and intelligence gathering, while originating from leaders such as Carr B. White and George Crook, were undertaken and refined by Richard R. Blazer. Many of these procedures became part of the curriculum in American military academies. Near the end of the 19th century, these tactics influenced operations of George Crook in the American Indian Wars and Harrison Gray Otis in the Philippine Insurrection.

== See also ==
- West Virginia in the Civil War
- List of Ohio Civil War units
- List of Union units from West Virginia in the American Civil War
