= Scamman =

Scamman is a surname. Notable people with the surname include:

- Doug Scamman, American farmer and politician
- Edith Scamman (1882–1967), American botanist
- John Fairfield Scamman (1786–1858), American politician
- Seth Scamman (1811–1894), American farmer, educator and politician
- Stella Scamman, American farmer, teacher and politician

== See also ==
- Scamman Farm, in Stratham, New Hampshire, U.S.
- Scammon (disambiguation)
