= Scammon (surname) =

Scammon is a surname. Notable people with the surname include:

- Charles Melville Scammon (1825–1911), American whaleman, naturalist, and author.
- Eliakim P. Scammon (1816–1894), American Civil War brigadier general
- J. Young Scammon (1812–1890), American politician, lawyer, banker, and newspaper publisher
- John Scammon (1865–1940), American politician and lawyer
- Richard M. Scammon (1915–2001), American author, political scientist and elections scholar

== See also ==
- Scammon (disambiguation)
- Scamman (disambiguation)
