= Scammon =

Scammon may refer to:

== People ==
- Scammon (surname)

== Places ==
- Fort Scammon, an archaeological site in West Virginia
- Scammon, Kansas, a city in Cherokee County
- Scammon Bay, Alaska, a city in the Kusilvak Census Area
  - Scammon Bay Airport, a state-owned public-use airport
- Scammon Farm Historic District, a historic area in New Hampshire
