= Battle of Kabletown =

Battle of the American Civil War

- Part of American Civil War
Date	November 18, 1864
Location	Kabletown, West Virginia 39°12′59″N 77°51′25″W
Result	Confederate victory

Belligerents
United States	(Confederate States of America) Confederacy

Commanders and leaders
Richard R. Blazer	John S. Mosby

Strength
Blazer's Scouts	43rd Battalion Virginia Cavalry

Casualties and losses
27	unknown
- Location of Kabletown Battle of Kabletown (the United States)

The Battle of Kabletown took place between Confederate and Union forces near the end of the American Civil War. Captain John S. Mosby, with nine companies of cavalry, defeated Captain Richard R. Blazer's outnumbered Blazer's Scouts.

== Background ==
In late 1864, General Ulysses S. Grant's Overland Campaign came to a close. He had laid siege to Petersburg. Captain Blazer's Scouts, a Union company, had already raided the city of Lynchburg, Virginia in the campaign against Richmond. Captain John S. Mosby of the Confederates decided to stop these raids against Virginia by bringing them to battle. On November 18, 1864, the forces met at Kabletown, West Virginia.

== Battle ==
Mosby had nine companies, the 43rd Battalion Virginia Cavalry, to Captain Richard R. Blazer's one. Mosby was able to defeat Blazer's Scouts due to superior numbers, inflicting 27 casualties. Of the entire number in Blazer's company, 65; 22 killed, 13 escaped and five of these were wounded.
