= SS John S. Mosby =

Liberty ship of WWII

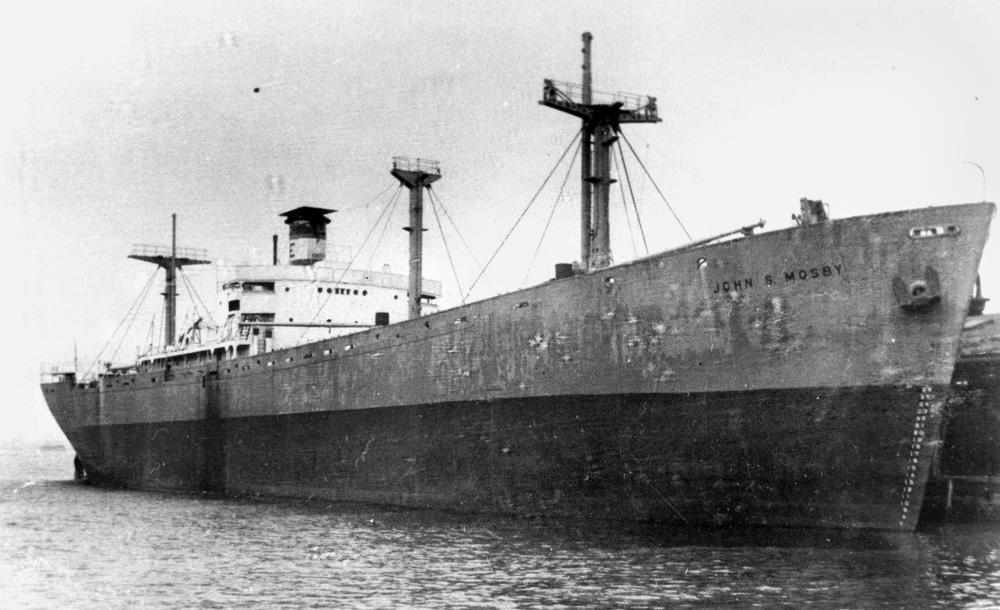

History

United States
- Name: John S. Mosby
- Namesake: John S. Mosby
- Owner: War Shipping Administration (WSA)
- Operator: Isthmian Steamship Co.
- Ordered: as type (EC2-S-C1) hull, MC hull 1207
- Builder: St. Johns River Shipbuilding Company, Jacksonville, Florida
- Cost: $1,661,505
- Yard number: 15
- Way number: 3
- Laid down: 22 July 1943
- Launched: 3 October 1943
- Completed: 16 October 1943
- Identification: Call sign: KTNX
- Fate: Laid up in the, National Defense Reserve Fleet, Wilmington, North Carolina, 7 June 1948; Laid up in the, Hudson River Reserve Fleet, Jones Point, New York, 3 October 1957; Sold for scrapping, 23 December 1970, removed from fleet, 1 July 1971

General characteristics
- Class & type: Liberty ship; type EC2-S-C1, standard
- Tonnage: 10,865 LT DWT; 7,176 GRT
- Displacement: 3,380 long tons (3,434 t) (light); 14,245 long tons (14,474 t) (max)
- Length: 441 feet 6 inches (135 m) oa; 416 feet (127 m) pp; 427 feet (130 m) lwl
- Beam: 57 feet (17 m)
- Draft: 27 ft 9.25 in (8.4646 m)
- Installed power: 2 × Oil fired 450 °F (232 °C) boilers, operating at 220 psi (1,500 kPa); 2,500 hp (1,900 kW)
- Propulsion: 1 × triple-expansion steam engine, (manufactured by General Machinery Corp., Hamilton, Ohio); 1 × screw propeller
- Speed: 11.5 knots (21.3 km/h; 13.2 mph)
- Capacity: 562,608 cubic feet (15,931 m^{3}) (grain); 499,573 cubic feet (14,146 m^{3}) (bale)
- Complement: 38–62 USMM; 21–40 USNAG
- Armament: Varied by ship; Bow-mounted 3-inch (76 mm)/50-caliber gun; Stern-mounted 4-inch (102 mm)/50-caliber gun; 2–8 × single 20-millimeter (0.79 in) Oerlikon anti-aircraft (AA) cannons and/or, 2–8 × 37-millimeter (1.46 in) M1 AA guns

SS John S. Mosby was a Liberty ship built in the United States during World War II. She was named after John S. Mosby, a Confederate army cavalry battalion commander in the American Civil War. After the war, Mosby worked as an attorney, supporting his former enemy's commander, U.S. President Ulysses S. Grant. He also served as the American consul to Hong Kong and in the US Department of Justice.

== Construction ==
John S. Mosby was laid down on 22 July 1943, under a Maritime Commission (MARCOM) contract, MC hull 1207, by the St. Johns River Shipbuilding Company, Jacksonville, Florida; she was launched on 3 October 1943.

== History ==
She was allocated to Isthmian Steamship Co., on 16 October 1943. On 7 June 1948, she was laid up in the National Defense Reserve Fleet, Wilmington, North Carolina. She was laid up in the, Hudson River Reserve Fleet, Jones Point, New York, 3 October 1957. She was sold for scrapping, on 23 December 1970, to Dawood Corp., Ltd. She was removed from the fleet on 1 July 1971.

== Bibliography ==
- "St. John's River Shipbuilding, Jacksonville FL". www.ShipbuildingHistory.com. 16 October 2010.
- Maritime Administration. "John S. Mosby". Ship History Database Vessel Status Card. U.S. Department of Transportation, Maritime Administration.
- Davies, James (May 2004). "Specifications (As-Built)" (PDF). p. 23.
- "SS John S. Mosby".
