= Jessie Scouts =

The Jessie Scouts were irregular soldiers during the American Civil War on the side of the Union who frequently operated in the territory of the Confederate States of America.

The unit was created by John C. Frémont and named in honor of his wife, rather than of a Colonel Jessie, who was himself a myth. The initial Jessie Scout unit was formed in St. Louis, Missouri early in the war as the plan to develop independent scouts was implemented. The first man to command the scouts was Captain Charles C. Carpenter. During insurgency missions the Jessie Scouts wore Confederate uniforms with a white handkerchief over their shoulders to signify their allegiance to friendly troops, and numbered around 58 for much of the war. They were commanded by Major Henry Young from November 1864 until the end of the war. In February 1865 they captured Harry Gilmor and killed Guerilla leader Captain George W Stump.

== Henry Young ==
Major Henry Young (breveted to lieutenant colonel at the end of the war) was the commander of the Jessie Scouts from November 1864 to April 1865. He was born in Mendon, Massachusetts, on February 9, 1841. He was, "A child of slender physique, but handsome, and high-spirited from his boyhood…" Young's father died when he was at a young age, which shaped him into the man he became, as he had to care for his mother and younger sister. When the war started, Young was eager to enlist and was among the first to answer his country's call. Through the influence of friends he had hopes of a commission, and at Lincoln's call for 75,000 men, he determined to enter the service. With his sister, a child of ten years, driving for him, and a book of tactics open on his knee, he went from house to house, through the villages of Blackstone Valley, stopping in public places and calling a crowd around his carriage, he harangued them with such patriotic ardor that in one day he enlisted sixty-three men.

Young enlisted in the 2nd Rhode Island Infantry in June 1861 at the age of 20. He fought in the Battle of Bull Run in July and was promoted to 2nd lieutenant shortly after the battle. He was promoted to 1st lieutenant in November 1861 and to captain in April 1863 and served as an Acting Assistant Inspector General at brigade headquarters.

He was promoted to major in April 1864 and served as chief of scouts to Major General Philip Sheridan, commander of the Cavalry Corps of the Army of the Potomac. In this position he commanded the Jessie Scouts and conducted numerous unconventional warfare missions. Young was noted for his ability to disguise himself as a Confederate soldier and infiltrate Confederate encampments as a means of gathering intelligence. He was noted for his singlehanded capture of Confederate Colonel Harry Gilmor on February 4, 1865.

Young was mustered out of service in July 1865.

In 1866, Young was killed in a military expedition in Mexico. Upon hearing of Young's death, General Sheridan wrote "Major Young’s record during the war, if the details could be gathered, would be of more interest than any romance of war ever written. I shall always remember him with pride and affection."

A statue was dedicated to Young in 1911 and is located at Kennedy Plaza in Providence, Rhode Island.

== William J. Lawton ==
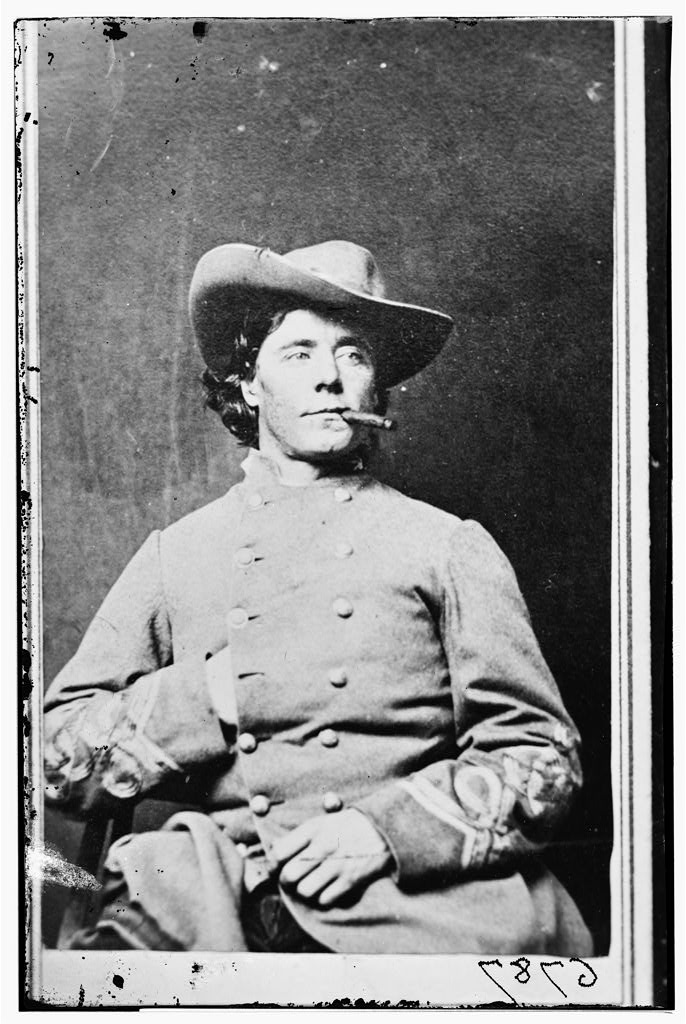
Captain William J Lawton

William J. Lawton was from Michigan; he was a scout for Julius Stahel in Virginia and George Thomas in Northwest Georgia/Southeast Tenn
On March 31, 1864 while leading a patrol of the 4th Michigan Cavalry he was shot and killed in Walker County, Georgia

== Jack Sterry ==
Jack Sterry was a Jessie Scout who was caught and hanged by the Confederates. He had been pretending to be a Confederate guide, but General Hood became suspicious when Sterry kept changing his story and who he was. "And the guide suddenly remembered that he had never really belonged to Hampton's Legion; that the story grew out of a little romance of his, and had grown out of a love affair. In the Shenandoah Valley, he explained, there was a beautiful maiden who had caught his fancy, but the girl was romantic and did not care for plodding foot-soldiers. All her dreams were of knights and heroes and cavaliers on prancing steeds, so he had deserted from the infantry and captured a horse, and his real name was Harry Brooks, and he believed that in the stress of battle or campaign he could throw himself in the way of some enterprising commander and render such gallant service as would win approval; and when by daring deeds he had distinguished himself, as only a trooper can, he would confess his fault and leave the rest to fortune." Eventually, they found the dying Confederate dispatch bearer. The dispatch bearer had been " 'shot by one of our own men" and had his dispatches stolen. From one account, Sterry's last words were, "...I will simply ask you to say, if you should ever speak of this, that Jack Sterry, when the rebels got him, died as a Jessie Scout should!"

== Arch H. Rowand ==
Arch Rowand was a Jessie Scout who spoke at the dedication of Henry Young's memorial statue in Providence, Rhode Island. A copy of his speech can be found here. Rowand ended his speech with, "In the name of the scouts, we congratulate you and we thank you. You are doing justice to a splendid soul and we feel in every fibre of our being, for we did, and do 'think God A'mighty of him.' "

== See also ==
- American Civil War spies
