= Scammon Farm Historic District =

Historic district in New Hampshire

- U.S. National Register of Historic Places
- Location within New Hampshire Location within the United States
- Location: 21–25 River Road, Stratham, New Hampshire
- Coordinates: 43.00192°N 70.9284°W
- NRHP reference No.: 100009402
- Added to NRHP: October 10, 2023

Scammon Farm Historic District is a historic area in Stratham, New Hampshire. It was added to the National Register of Historic Places in October 2023.

The farm, dating to 1681 and covering over 150 acres (61 ha) in the late 19th century, is located between the Squamscott River and Portsmouth Avenue (NH Route 108). A farmhouse dates to 1812, two sheds date to circa 1840, and a barn dates to 1860. Two other houses on the property date to 1910 and 1965. A family cemetery on the property dates to at least 1840.

The similarly named Scamman Farm, also located in Stratham and owned by a different branch of the family, was added to the National Register of Historic Places in 2019.

== See also ==
- National Register of Historic Places listings in Rockingham County, New Hampshire
