= Kabletown, West Virginia =

- Unincorporated community
- Location within West Virginia Location within the United States
- Coordinates: 39°12′59″N 77°51′25″W
- Country: United States
- State: West Virginia
- County: Jefferson
- Time zone: UTC-5 (Eastern (EST))
  - Summer (DST): UTC-4 (EDT)
- GNIS feature ID: 1541055

Kabletown is an unincorporated community in Jefferson County, West Virginia, United States. The town lies along a spring-fed stream called Bullskin Run near the Shenandoah River on Kabletown Road (County Route 25), very close to the border with Virginia. Kabletown's population was 10,073 in 2000.

The community derives its name from the local Kable family.

During the Civil War, the Battle of Kabletown took place on November 18, 1864, between Mosby's Rangers and Blazer's Scouts.
