= Scamman Farm =

Historic building in New Hampshire

- U.S. National Register of Historic Places
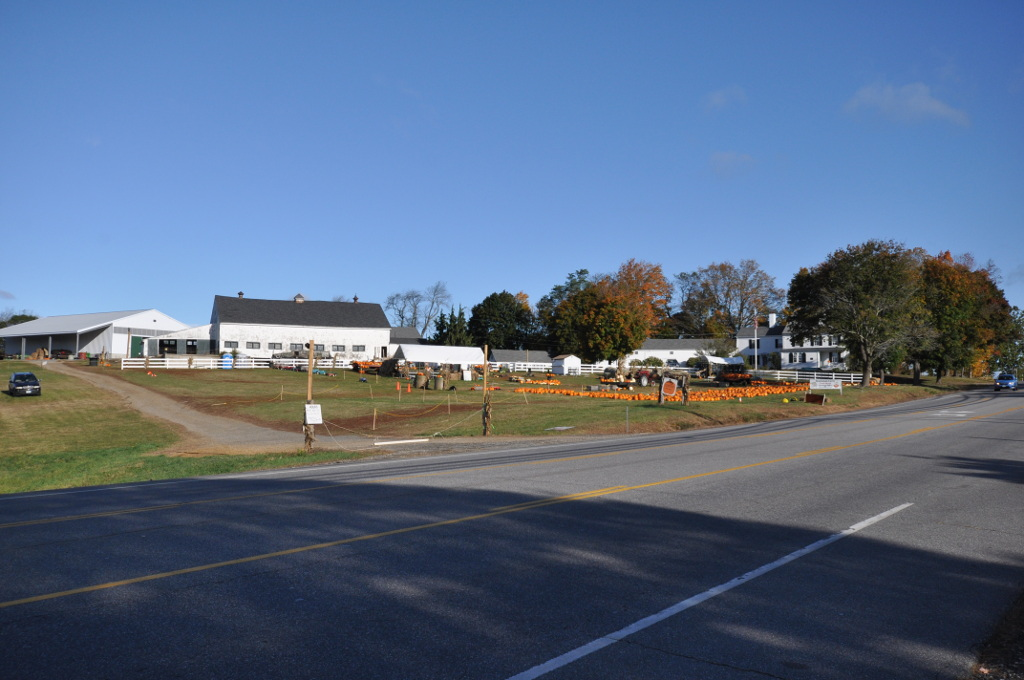
- Scamman Farm in October 2019

- Location within New Hampshire Location within the United States
- Location: 69 Portsmouth Ave., Stratham, New Hampshire
- Coordinates: 43°0′33″N 70°55′7″W
- Built: c.1750
- NRHP reference No.: 100003597
- Added to NRHP: April 4, 2019

Scamman Farm is a historic farmstead at Portsmouth Avenue in Stratham, New Hampshire. The farm was established by members of the Scamman family in the 1660s, and includes a barn dating to the mid-18th century, believed to be one of the oldest in the state, and a Greek Revival farmhouse dating to 1836. The property, now a subset of the family's original holdings, was listed on the National Register of Historic Places in 2019.

A fire that began shortly before 11 p.m. on May 10, 2021, burned down one barn on the property and killed an estimated 300 chickens. Through the efforts of firefighters, the mid-18th century barn suffered only minor damage. Days later, the family stated that they would rebuild the barn that burned down.

The similarly named Scammon Farm Historic District, also located in Stratham and owned by a different branch of the family, was added to the National Register of Historic Places in 2023.

== See also ==
- National Register of Historic Places listings in Rockingham County, New Hampshire
- Doug Scamman
