= Fort Scammon =

- U.S. National Register of Historic Places
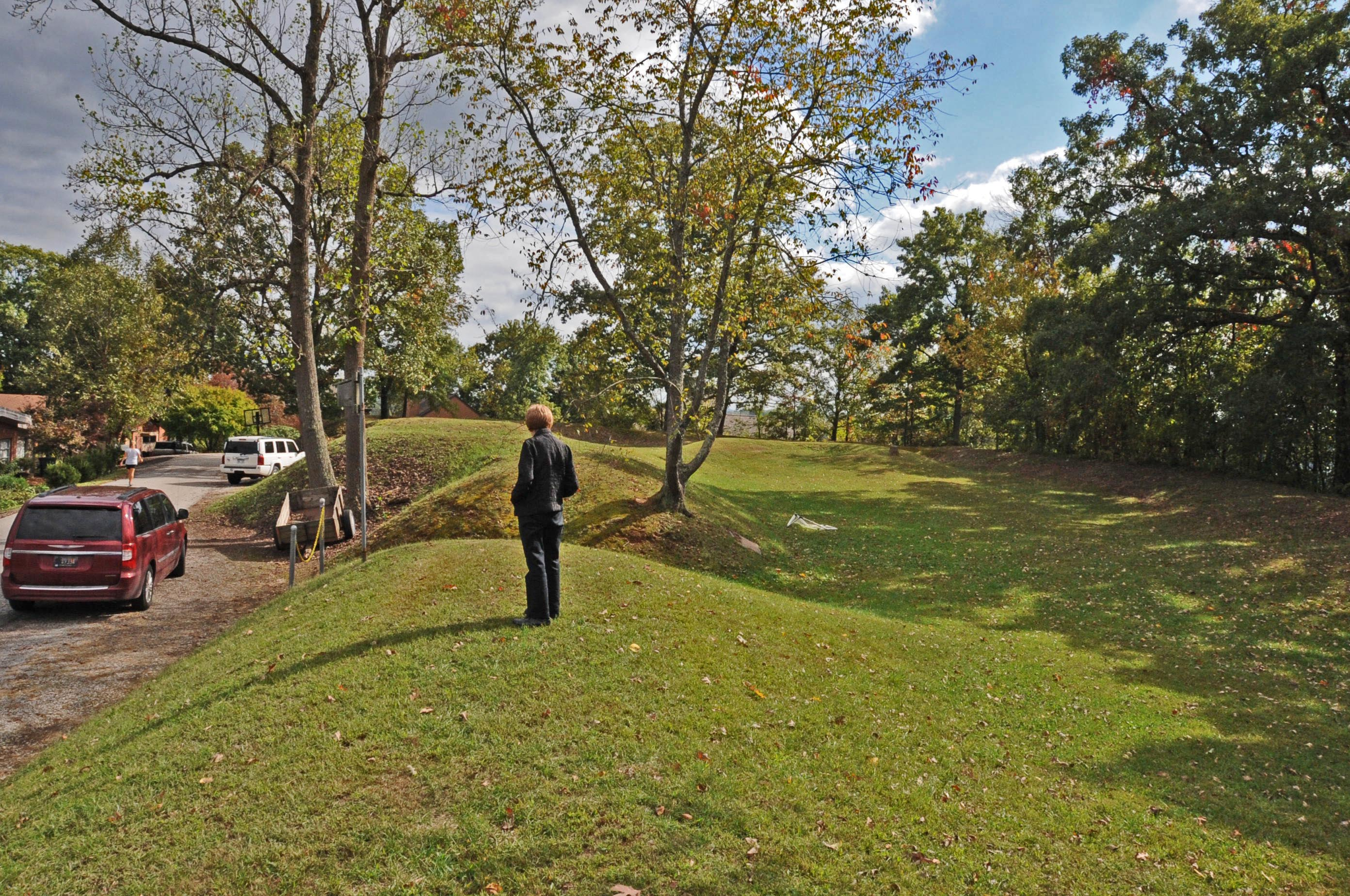

- Location within West Virginia
- Location: Charleston, West Virginia
- Coordinates: 38°21′07″N 81°39′20″W
- Built: 1862
- NRHP reference No.: 76001939
- Added to NRHP: March 26, 1976

Fort Scammon, also known as Camp White or Fort Hill, is an archaeological site in Charleston in Kanawha County, West Virginia. The site preserves earthenwork battlements that were set up in 1863 in an elliptical pattern. The period of significance during the American Civil War coincides with the period of late summer in 1862 when Confederate artillery fired from the area and the year or so after March 1863 when Union troops fortified the heights.

Located atop a prominence known today as "Fort Hill", it was listed on the National Register of Historic Places in 1976.
